

470001–470100 

|-bgcolor=#E9E9E9
| 470001 ||  || — || December 19, 2004 || Mount Lemmon || Mount Lemmon Survey || — || align=right | 2.7 km || 
|-id=002 bgcolor=#E9E9E9
| 470002 ||  || — || May 25, 2006 || Mauna Kea || P. A. Wiegert || — || align=right | 2.4 km || 
|-id=003 bgcolor=#E9E9E9
| 470003 ||  || — || June 4, 2006 || Kitt Peak || Spacewatch || — || align=right | 2.2 km || 
|-id=004 bgcolor=#FFC2E0
| 470004 ||  || — || June 22, 2006 || Anderson Mesa || LONEOS || APOcritical || align=right data-sort-value="0.68" | 680 m || 
|-id=005 bgcolor=#d6d6d6
| 470005 ||  || — || July 21, 2006 || Mount Lemmon || Mount Lemmon Survey || — || align=right | 2.9 km || 
|-id=006 bgcolor=#fefefe
| 470006 ||  || — || July 21, 2006 || Mount Lemmon || Mount Lemmon Survey || — || align=right data-sort-value="0.53" | 530 m || 
|-id=007 bgcolor=#FA8072
| 470007 ||  || — || July 21, 2006 || Mount Lemmon || Mount Lemmon Survey || — || align=right data-sort-value="0.81" | 810 m || 
|-id=008 bgcolor=#d6d6d6
| 470008 ||  || — || August 21, 2006 || Kitt Peak || Spacewatch || — || align=right | 2.1 km || 
|-id=009 bgcolor=#d6d6d6
| 470009 ||  || — || August 27, 2006 || Kitt Peak || Spacewatch || — || align=right | 2.7 km || 
|-id=010 bgcolor=#FA8072
| 470010 ||  || — || August 20, 2006 || Palomar || NEAT || — || align=right data-sort-value="0.57" | 570 m || 
|-id=011 bgcolor=#fefefe
| 470011 ||  || — || March 21, 2002 || Kitt Peak || Spacewatch || — || align=right data-sort-value="0.67" | 670 m || 
|-id=012 bgcolor=#d6d6d6
| 470012 ||  || — || August 31, 2006 || Marly || Naef Obs. || — || align=right | 2.6 km || 
|-id=013 bgcolor=#fefefe
| 470013 ||  || — || August 19, 2006 || Kitt Peak || Spacewatch || — || align=right data-sort-value="0.65" | 650 m || 
|-id=014 bgcolor=#d6d6d6
| 470014 ||  || — || August 19, 2006 || Kitt Peak || Spacewatch || — || align=right | 2.4 km || 
|-id=015 bgcolor=#d6d6d6
| 470015 ||  || — || September 12, 2006 || Catalina || CSS || — || align=right | 2.4 km || 
|-id=016 bgcolor=#fefefe
| 470016 ||  || — || August 19, 2006 || Kitt Peak || Spacewatch || — || align=right data-sort-value="0.62" | 620 m || 
|-id=017 bgcolor=#d6d6d6
| 470017 ||  || — || September 14, 2006 || Kitt Peak || Spacewatch || EOS || align=right | 1.7 km || 
|-id=018 bgcolor=#d6d6d6
| 470018 ||  || — || September 14, 2006 || Kitt Peak || Spacewatch || — || align=right | 2.4 km || 
|-id=019 bgcolor=#d6d6d6
| 470019 ||  || — || September 14, 2006 || Kitt Peak || Spacewatch || — || align=right | 2.6 km || 
|-id=020 bgcolor=#fefefe
| 470020 ||  || — || August 29, 2006 || Catalina || CSS || — || align=right data-sort-value="0.66" | 660 m || 
|-id=021 bgcolor=#d6d6d6
| 470021 ||  || — || August 29, 2006 || Kitt Peak || Spacewatch || — || align=right | 3.0 km || 
|-id=022 bgcolor=#fefefe
| 470022 ||  || — || September 15, 2006 || Kitt Peak || Spacewatch || — || align=right data-sort-value="0.75" | 750 m || 
|-id=023 bgcolor=#d6d6d6
| 470023 ||  || — || September 15, 2006 || Kitt Peak || Spacewatch || — || align=right | 2.4 km || 
|-id=024 bgcolor=#d6d6d6
| 470024 ||  || — || September 15, 2006 || Kitt Peak || Spacewatch || — || align=right | 1.8 km || 
|-id=025 bgcolor=#d6d6d6
| 470025 ||  || — || September 15, 2006 || Kitt Peak || Spacewatch || — || align=right | 1.9 km || 
|-id=026 bgcolor=#d6d6d6
| 470026 ||  || — || September 15, 2006 || Kitt Peak || Spacewatch || EMA || align=right | 3.0 km || 
|-id=027 bgcolor=#C2E0FF
| 470027 ||  || — || September 11, 2006 || Apache Point || A. C. Becker, A. W. Puckett, J. Kubica || other TNO || align=right | 260 km || 
|-id=028 bgcolor=#d6d6d6
| 470028 ||  || — || September 16, 2006 || Catalina || CSS || — || align=right | 2.6 km || 
|-id=029 bgcolor=#fefefe
| 470029 ||  || — || September 16, 2006 || Catalina || CSS || — || align=right data-sort-value="0.77" | 770 m || 
|-id=030 bgcolor=#fefefe
| 470030 ||  || — || September 14, 2006 || Kitt Peak || Spacewatch || — || align=right data-sort-value="0.62" | 620 m || 
|-id=031 bgcolor=#d6d6d6
| 470031 ||  || — || September 16, 2006 || Kitt Peak || Spacewatch || — || align=right | 3.9 km || 
|-id=032 bgcolor=#fefefe
| 470032 ||  || — || September 17, 2006 || Socorro || LINEAR || — || align=right data-sort-value="0.98" | 980 m || 
|-id=033 bgcolor=#d6d6d6
| 470033 ||  || — || September 17, 2006 || Catalina || CSS || — || align=right | 2.7 km || 
|-id=034 bgcolor=#d6d6d6
| 470034 ||  || — || September 17, 2006 || Kitt Peak || Spacewatch || — || align=right | 2.8 km || 
|-id=035 bgcolor=#d6d6d6
| 470035 ||  || — || September 17, 2006 || Kitt Peak || Spacewatch || — || align=right | 2.4 km || 
|-id=036 bgcolor=#fefefe
| 470036 ||  || — || August 28, 2006 || Anderson Mesa || LONEOS || — || align=right data-sort-value="0.66" | 660 m || 
|-id=037 bgcolor=#d6d6d6
| 470037 ||  || — || September 18, 2006 || Kitt Peak || Spacewatch || EOS || align=right | 1.6 km || 
|-id=038 bgcolor=#fefefe
| 470038 ||  || — || December 1, 2003 || Kitt Peak || Spacewatch || — || align=right data-sort-value="0.76" | 760 m || 
|-id=039 bgcolor=#d6d6d6
| 470039 ||  || — || September 17, 2006 || Kitt Peak || Spacewatch || — || align=right | 2.4 km || 
|-id=040 bgcolor=#d6d6d6
| 470040 ||  || — || September 18, 2006 || Kitt Peak || Spacewatch || EOS || align=right | 1.6 km || 
|-id=041 bgcolor=#fefefe
| 470041 ||  || — || September 18, 2006 || Kitt Peak || Spacewatch || — || align=right data-sort-value="0.62" | 620 m || 
|-id=042 bgcolor=#d6d6d6
| 470042 ||  || — || September 19, 2006 || Kitt Peak || Spacewatch || — || align=right | 2.3 km || 
|-id=043 bgcolor=#fefefe
| 470043 ||  || — || September 21, 2006 || Anderson Mesa || LONEOS || — || align=right data-sort-value="0.64" | 640 m || 
|-id=044 bgcolor=#d6d6d6
| 470044 ||  || — || September 17, 2006 || Kitt Peak || Spacewatch || — || align=right | 3.2 km || 
|-id=045 bgcolor=#d6d6d6
| 470045 ||  || — || September 24, 2006 || Calvin-Rehoboth || L. A. Molnar || — || align=right | 2.3 km || 
|-id=046 bgcolor=#fefefe
| 470046 ||  || — || September 16, 2006 || Catalina || CSS || — || align=right data-sort-value="0.64" | 640 m || 
|-id=047 bgcolor=#fefefe
| 470047 ||  || — || July 21, 2006 || Mount Lemmon || Mount Lemmon Survey || — || align=right data-sort-value="0.73" | 730 m || 
|-id=048 bgcolor=#fefefe
| 470048 ||  || — || September 17, 2006 || Catalina || CSS || — || align=right data-sort-value="0.65" | 650 m || 
|-id=049 bgcolor=#d6d6d6
| 470049 ||  || — || September 25, 2006 || Kitt Peak || Spacewatch || EOS || align=right | 1.3 km || 
|-id=050 bgcolor=#fefefe
| 470050 ||  || — || September 25, 2006 || Anderson Mesa || LONEOS || — || align=right data-sort-value="0.70" | 700 m || 
|-id=051 bgcolor=#d6d6d6
| 470051 ||  || — || September 25, 2006 || Mount Lemmon || Mount Lemmon Survey || — || align=right | 2.2 km || 
|-id=052 bgcolor=#d6d6d6
| 470052 ||  || — || September 25, 2006 || Kitt Peak || Spacewatch || EOS || align=right | 1.5 km || 
|-id=053 bgcolor=#d6d6d6
| 470053 ||  || — || March 17, 2004 || Kitt Peak || Spacewatch || — || align=right | 2.2 km || 
|-id=054 bgcolor=#d6d6d6
| 470054 ||  || — || September 25, 2006 || Kitt Peak || Spacewatch || KOR || align=right | 1.3 km || 
|-id=055 bgcolor=#fefefe
| 470055 ||  || — || September 25, 2006 || Kitt Peak || Spacewatch || — || align=right data-sort-value="0.75" | 750 m || 
|-id=056 bgcolor=#fefefe
| 470056 ||  || — || July 21, 2006 || Mount Lemmon || Mount Lemmon Survey || — || align=right data-sort-value="0.72" | 720 m || 
|-id=057 bgcolor=#d6d6d6
| 470057 ||  || — || September 16, 2006 || Kitt Peak || Spacewatch || — || align=right | 2.1 km || 
|-id=058 bgcolor=#fefefe
| 470058 ||  || — || July 21, 2006 || Mount Lemmon || Mount Lemmon Survey || — || align=right data-sort-value="0.67" | 670 m || 
|-id=059 bgcolor=#fefefe
| 470059 ||  || — || September 28, 2006 || Kitt Peak || Spacewatch || H || align=right data-sort-value="0.68" | 680 m || 
|-id=060 bgcolor=#d6d6d6
| 470060 ||  || — || September 18, 2006 || Kitt Peak || Spacewatch || EOS || align=right | 1.7 km || 
|-id=061 bgcolor=#fefefe
| 470061 ||  || — || September 18, 2006 || Kitt Peak || Spacewatch || — || align=right data-sort-value="0.75" | 750 m || 
|-id=062 bgcolor=#fefefe
| 470062 ||  || — || September 18, 2006 || Kitt Peak || Spacewatch || — || align=right data-sort-value="0.50" | 500 m || 
|-id=063 bgcolor=#fefefe
| 470063 ||  || — || September 18, 2006 || Kitt Peak || Spacewatch || — || align=right data-sort-value="0.74" | 740 m || 
|-id=064 bgcolor=#d6d6d6
| 470064 ||  || — || September 26, 2006 || Mount Lemmon || Mount Lemmon Survey || TEL || align=right | 1.1 km || 
|-id=065 bgcolor=#d6d6d6
| 470065 ||  || — || September 14, 2006 || Kitt Peak || Spacewatch || EOS || align=right | 1.7 km || 
|-id=066 bgcolor=#d6d6d6
| 470066 ||  || — || September 19, 2006 || Kitt Peak || Spacewatch || — || align=right | 3.1 km || 
|-id=067 bgcolor=#d6d6d6
| 470067 ||  || — || September 26, 2006 || Kitt Peak || Spacewatch || EOS || align=right | 1.6 km || 
|-id=068 bgcolor=#FA8072
| 470068 ||  || — || September 27, 2006 || Socorro || LINEAR || — || align=right data-sort-value="0.82" | 820 m || 
|-id=069 bgcolor=#FA8072
| 470069 ||  || — || September 17, 2006 || Catalina || CSS || — || align=right data-sort-value="0.93" | 930 m || 
|-id=070 bgcolor=#FA8072
| 470070 ||  || — || September 29, 2006 || Anderson Mesa || LONEOS || — || align=right data-sort-value="0.80" | 800 m || 
|-id=071 bgcolor=#fefefe
| 470071 ||  || — || September 27, 2006 || Catalina || CSS || V || align=right data-sort-value="0.60" | 600 m || 
|-id=072 bgcolor=#d6d6d6
| 470072 ||  || — || September 25, 2006 || Mount Lemmon || Mount Lemmon Survey || — || align=right | 2.0 km || 
|-id=073 bgcolor=#fefefe
| 470073 ||  || — || September 17, 2006 || Kitt Peak || Spacewatch || — || align=right data-sort-value="0.76" | 760 m || 
|-id=074 bgcolor=#fefefe
| 470074 ||  || — || September 17, 2006 || Kitt Peak || Spacewatch || — || align=right data-sort-value="0.49" | 490 m || 
|-id=075 bgcolor=#d6d6d6
| 470075 ||  || — || September 27, 2006 || Kitt Peak || Spacewatch || — || align=right | 2.0 km || 
|-id=076 bgcolor=#d6d6d6
| 470076 ||  || — || September 23, 2006 || Kitt Peak || Spacewatch || — || align=right | 2.3 km || 
|-id=077 bgcolor=#fefefe
| 470077 ||  || — || September 19, 2006 || Kitt Peak || Spacewatch || — || align=right data-sort-value="0.61" | 610 m || 
|-id=078 bgcolor=#d6d6d6
| 470078 ||  || — || September 28, 2006 || Kitt Peak || Spacewatch || — || align=right | 2.3 km || 
|-id=079 bgcolor=#fefefe
| 470079 ||  || — || September 30, 2006 || Mount Lemmon || Mount Lemmon Survey || critical || align=right data-sort-value="0.65" | 650 m || 
|-id=080 bgcolor=#d6d6d6
| 470080 ||  || — || September 30, 2006 || Mount Lemmon || Mount Lemmon Survey || EOS || align=right | 2.1 km || 
|-id=081 bgcolor=#fefefe
| 470081 ||  || — || September 30, 2006 || Catalina || CSS || — || align=right data-sort-value="0.77" | 770 m || 
|-id=082 bgcolor=#d6d6d6
| 470082 ||  || — || September 18, 2006 || Catalina || CSS || — || align=right | 2.4 km || 
|-id=083 bgcolor=#C2E0FF
| 470083 ||  || — || September 16, 2006 || Apache Point || A. C. Becker, A. W. Puckett, J. Kubica || twotino || align=right | 131 km || 
|-id=084 bgcolor=#d6d6d6
| 470084 ||  || — || September 27, 2006 || Apache Point || A. C. Becker || EOS || align=right | 1.6 km || 
|-id=085 bgcolor=#d6d6d6
| 470085 ||  || — || September 27, 2006 || Apache Point || A. C. Becker || EOS || align=right | 1.8 km || 
|-id=086 bgcolor=#d6d6d6
| 470086 ||  || — || September 29, 2006 || Apache Point || A. C. Becker || EOS || align=right | 1.4 km || 
|-id=087 bgcolor=#d6d6d6
| 470087 ||  || — || September 30, 2006 || Apache Point || A. C. Becker || — || align=right | 2.3 km || 
|-id=088 bgcolor=#d6d6d6
| 470088 ||  || — || September 30, 2006 || Apache Point || A. C. Becker || — || align=right | 2.2 km || 
|-id=089 bgcolor=#d6d6d6
| 470089 ||  || — || September 26, 2006 || Mount Lemmon || Mount Lemmon Survey || — || align=right | 2.0 km || 
|-id=090 bgcolor=#d6d6d6
| 470090 ||  || — || September 25, 2006 || Mount Lemmon || Mount Lemmon Survey || — || align=right | 3.3 km || 
|-id=091 bgcolor=#d6d6d6
| 470091 ||  || — || September 26, 2006 || Mount Lemmon || Mount Lemmon Survey || — || align=right | 2.3 km || 
|-id=092 bgcolor=#FA8072
| 470092 ||  || — || September 17, 2006 || Kitt Peak || Spacewatch || — || align=right data-sort-value="0.62" | 620 m || 
|-id=093 bgcolor=#fefefe
| 470093 ||  || — || September 18, 2006 || Anderson Mesa || LONEOS || — || align=right data-sort-value="0.57" | 570 m || 
|-id=094 bgcolor=#d6d6d6
| 470094 ||  || — || September 17, 2006 || Kitt Peak || Spacewatch || EOS || align=right | 1.7 km || 
|-id=095 bgcolor=#d6d6d6
| 470095 ||  || — || September 25, 2006 || Mount Lemmon || Mount Lemmon Survey || THM || align=right | 2.5 km || 
|-id=096 bgcolor=#d6d6d6
| 470096 ||  || — || September 28, 2006 || Mount Lemmon || Mount Lemmon Survey || — || align=right | 2.2 km || 
|-id=097 bgcolor=#d6d6d6
| 470097 ||  || — || October 12, 2006 || Kitt Peak || Spacewatch || — || align=right | 2.9 km || 
|-id=098 bgcolor=#d6d6d6
| 470098 ||  || — || October 12, 2006 || Kitt Peak || Spacewatch || — || align=right | 2.2 km || 
|-id=099 bgcolor=#d6d6d6
| 470099 ||  || — || September 26, 2006 || Mount Lemmon || Mount Lemmon Survey || — || align=right | 2.6 km || 
|-id=100 bgcolor=#d6d6d6
| 470100 ||  || — || September 30, 2006 || Mount Lemmon || Mount Lemmon Survey || — || align=right | 2.9 km || 
|}

470101–470200 

|-bgcolor=#fefefe
| 470101 ||  || — || October 12, 2006 || Kitt Peak || Spacewatch || — || align=right data-sort-value="0.68" | 680 m || 
|-id=102 bgcolor=#d6d6d6
| 470102 ||  || — || October 12, 2006 || Kitt Peak || Spacewatch || — || align=right | 3.7 km || 
|-id=103 bgcolor=#fefefe
| 470103 ||  || — || October 13, 2006 || Kitt Peak || Spacewatch || — || align=right data-sort-value="0.77" | 770 m || 
|-id=104 bgcolor=#fefefe
| 470104 ||  || — || October 4, 2006 || Mount Lemmon || Mount Lemmon Survey || H || align=right data-sort-value="0.60" | 600 m || 
|-id=105 bgcolor=#fefefe
| 470105 ||  || — || October 13, 2006 || Kitt Peak || Spacewatch || V || align=right data-sort-value="0.62" | 620 m || 
|-id=106 bgcolor=#fefefe
| 470106 ||  || — || October 11, 2006 || Palomar || NEAT || — || align=right data-sort-value="0.82" | 820 m || 
|-id=107 bgcolor=#d6d6d6
| 470107 ||  || — || October 4, 2006 || Mount Lemmon || Mount Lemmon Survey || — || align=right | 2.3 km || 
|-id=108 bgcolor=#d6d6d6
| 470108 ||  || — || October 4, 2006 || Mount Lemmon || Mount Lemmon Survey || — || align=right | 2.8 km || 
|-id=109 bgcolor=#d6d6d6
| 470109 ||  || — || October 4, 2006 || Mount Lemmon || Mount Lemmon Survey || — || align=right | 2.7 km || 
|-id=110 bgcolor=#fefefe
| 470110 ||  || — || October 13, 2006 || Kitt Peak || Spacewatch || — || align=right data-sort-value="0.78" | 780 m || 
|-id=111 bgcolor=#d6d6d6
| 470111 ||  || — || October 4, 2006 || Mount Lemmon || Mount Lemmon Survey || — || align=right | 3.0 km || 
|-id=112 bgcolor=#fefefe
| 470112 ||  || — || October 2, 2006 || Mount Lemmon || Mount Lemmon Survey || — || align=right data-sort-value="0.75" | 750 m || 
|-id=113 bgcolor=#fefefe
| 470113 ||  || — || October 15, 2006 || Kitt Peak || Spacewatch || — || align=right data-sort-value="0.66" | 660 m || 
|-id=114 bgcolor=#d6d6d6
| 470114 ||  || — || October 4, 2006 || Mount Lemmon || Mount Lemmon Survey || — || align=right | 2.9 km || 
|-id=115 bgcolor=#d6d6d6
| 470115 ||  || — || October 3, 2006 || Apache Point || A. C. Becker || — || align=right | 2.0 km || 
|-id=116 bgcolor=#d6d6d6
| 470116 ||  || — || October 11, 2006 || Apache Point || A. C. Becker || — || align=right | 2.5 km || 
|-id=117 bgcolor=#d6d6d6
| 470117 ||  || — || October 12, 2006 || Kitt Peak || Spacewatch || — || align=right | 2.1 km || 
|-id=118 bgcolor=#d6d6d6
| 470118 ||  || — || October 12, 2006 || Kitt Peak || Spacewatch || — || align=right | 2.9 km || 
|-id=119 bgcolor=#d6d6d6
| 470119 ||  || — || October 13, 2006 || Kitt Peak || Spacewatch || — || align=right | 3.1 km || 
|-id=120 bgcolor=#d6d6d6
| 470120 ||  || — || October 4, 2006 || Mount Lemmon || Mount Lemmon Survey || VER || align=right | 2.8 km || 
|-id=121 bgcolor=#d6d6d6
| 470121 ||  || — || October 13, 2006 || Kitt Peak || Spacewatch || — || align=right | 2.3 km || 
|-id=122 bgcolor=#d6d6d6
| 470122 ||  || — || October 2, 2006 || Mount Lemmon || Mount Lemmon Survey || — || align=right | 2.4 km || 
|-id=123 bgcolor=#fefefe
| 470123 ||  || — || October 16, 2006 || Mount Lemmon || Mount Lemmon Survey || H || align=right data-sort-value="0.54" | 540 m || 
|-id=124 bgcolor=#d6d6d6
| 470124 ||  || — || October 2, 2006 || Mount Lemmon || Mount Lemmon Survey || — || align=right | 2.8 km || 
|-id=125 bgcolor=#d6d6d6
| 470125 ||  || — || October 17, 2006 || Mount Lemmon || Mount Lemmon Survey || — || align=right | 2.7 km || 
|-id=126 bgcolor=#fefefe
| 470126 ||  || — || October 17, 2006 || Mount Lemmon || Mount Lemmon Survey || — || align=right data-sort-value="0.72" | 720 m || 
|-id=127 bgcolor=#fefefe
| 470127 ||  || — || September 18, 2006 || Kitt Peak || Spacewatch || — || align=right data-sort-value="0.60" | 600 m || 
|-id=128 bgcolor=#fefefe
| 470128 ||  || — || October 16, 2006 || Kitt Peak || Spacewatch || — || align=right data-sort-value="0.62" | 620 m || 
|-id=129 bgcolor=#d6d6d6
| 470129 ||  || — || October 4, 2006 || Mount Lemmon || Mount Lemmon Survey || critical || align=right | 1.8 km || 
|-id=130 bgcolor=#d6d6d6
| 470130 ||  || — || October 16, 2006 || Kitt Peak || Spacewatch || KOR || align=right | 1.3 km || 
|-id=131 bgcolor=#d6d6d6
| 470131 ||  || — || October 16, 2006 || Kitt Peak || Spacewatch || — || align=right | 2.5 km || 
|-id=132 bgcolor=#fefefe
| 470132 ||  || — || October 16, 2006 || Kitt Peak || Spacewatch || — || align=right data-sort-value="0.58" | 580 m || 
|-id=133 bgcolor=#d6d6d6
| 470133 ||  || — || September 30, 2006 || Mount Lemmon || Mount Lemmon Survey || — || align=right | 2.7 km || 
|-id=134 bgcolor=#d6d6d6
| 470134 ||  || — || October 16, 2006 || Kitt Peak || Spacewatch || critical || align=right | 1.6 km || 
|-id=135 bgcolor=#d6d6d6
| 470135 ||  || — || October 16, 2006 || Kitt Peak || Spacewatch || — || align=right | 2.0 km || 
|-id=136 bgcolor=#fefefe
| 470136 ||  || — || October 16, 2006 || Kitt Peak || Spacewatch || — || align=right data-sort-value="0.88" | 880 m || 
|-id=137 bgcolor=#fefefe
| 470137 ||  || — || September 19, 2006 || Kitt Peak || Spacewatch || — || align=right data-sort-value="0.54" | 540 m || 
|-id=138 bgcolor=#d6d6d6
| 470138 ||  || — || October 17, 2006 || Mount Lemmon || Mount Lemmon Survey || — || align=right | 2.3 km || 
|-id=139 bgcolor=#d6d6d6
| 470139 ||  || — || October 18, 2006 || Kitt Peak || Spacewatch || EOS || align=right | 1.6 km || 
|-id=140 bgcolor=#fefefe
| 470140 ||  || — || October 2, 2006 || Mount Lemmon || Mount Lemmon Survey || critical || align=right data-sort-value="0.62" | 620 m || 
|-id=141 bgcolor=#d6d6d6
| 470141 ||  || — || October 19, 2006 || Catalina || CSS || — || align=right | 3.0 km || 
|-id=142 bgcolor=#fefefe
| 470142 ||  || — || October 16, 2006 || Catalina || CSS || — || align=right data-sort-value="0.63" | 630 m || 
|-id=143 bgcolor=#d6d6d6
| 470143 ||  || — || September 28, 2006 || Mount Lemmon || Mount Lemmon Survey || — || align=right | 2.6 km || 
|-id=144 bgcolor=#d6d6d6
| 470144 ||  || — || September 26, 2006 || Kitt Peak || Spacewatch || — || align=right | 2.5 km || 
|-id=145 bgcolor=#d6d6d6
| 470145 ||  || — || September 30, 2006 || Kitt Peak || Spacewatch || EOS || align=right | 1.6 km || 
|-id=146 bgcolor=#d6d6d6
| 470146 ||  || — || September 25, 2006 || Kitt Peak || Spacewatch || — || align=right | 2.4 km || 
|-id=147 bgcolor=#d6d6d6
| 470147 ||  || — || September 25, 2006 || Kitt Peak || Spacewatch || — || align=right | 2.2 km || 
|-id=148 bgcolor=#d6d6d6
| 470148 ||  || — || October 17, 2006 || Mount Lemmon || Mount Lemmon Survey || — || align=right | 2.7 km || 
|-id=149 bgcolor=#d6d6d6
| 470149 ||  || — || October 17, 2006 || Kitt Peak || Spacewatch || — || align=right | 3.2 km || 
|-id=150 bgcolor=#d6d6d6
| 470150 ||  || — || October 17, 2006 || Kitt Peak || Spacewatch || — || align=right | 3.2 km || 
|-id=151 bgcolor=#d6d6d6
| 470151 ||  || — || October 3, 2006 || Mount Lemmon || Mount Lemmon Survey || — || align=right | 2.6 km || 
|-id=152 bgcolor=#d6d6d6
| 470152 ||  || — || October 18, 2006 || Kitt Peak || Spacewatch || — || align=right | 2.3 km || 
|-id=153 bgcolor=#fefefe
| 470153 ||  || — || October 3, 2006 || Mount Lemmon || Mount Lemmon Survey || — || align=right data-sort-value="0.53" | 530 m || 
|-id=154 bgcolor=#d6d6d6
| 470154 ||  || — || October 3, 2006 || Mount Lemmon || Mount Lemmon Survey || — || align=right | 2.2 km || 
|-id=155 bgcolor=#fefefe
| 470155 ||  || — || September 25, 2006 || Mount Lemmon || Mount Lemmon Survey || — || align=right data-sort-value="0.68" | 680 m || 
|-id=156 bgcolor=#fefefe
| 470156 ||  || — || September 18, 2006 || Kitt Peak || Spacewatch || — || align=right data-sort-value="0.68" | 680 m || 
|-id=157 bgcolor=#fefefe
| 470157 ||  || — || September 24, 2006 || Kitt Peak || Spacewatch || — || align=right data-sort-value="0.52" | 520 m || 
|-id=158 bgcolor=#d6d6d6
| 470158 ||  || — || October 19, 2006 || Kitt Peak || Spacewatch || — || align=right | 2.1 km || 
|-id=159 bgcolor=#d6d6d6
| 470159 ||  || — || October 19, 2006 || Kitt Peak || Spacewatch || VER || align=right | 2.7 km || 
|-id=160 bgcolor=#fefefe
| 470160 ||  || — || October 11, 2006 || Kitt Peak || Spacewatch || — || align=right data-sort-value="0.58" | 580 m || 
|-id=161 bgcolor=#fefefe
| 470161 ||  || — || October 19, 2006 || Kitt Peak || Spacewatch || — || align=right data-sort-value="0.54" | 540 m || 
|-id=162 bgcolor=#d6d6d6
| 470162 ||  || — || October 4, 2006 || Mount Lemmon || Mount Lemmon Survey || — || align=right | 2.6 km || 
|-id=163 bgcolor=#d6d6d6
| 470163 ||  || — || September 15, 2006 || Kitt Peak || Spacewatch || — || align=right | 3.2 km || 
|-id=164 bgcolor=#fefefe
| 470164 ||  || — || October 13, 2006 || Kitt Peak || Spacewatch || — || align=right data-sort-value="0.79" | 790 m || 
|-id=165 bgcolor=#d6d6d6
| 470165 ||  || — || October 20, 2006 || Mount Lemmon || Mount Lemmon Survey || — || align=right | 3.0 km || 
|-id=166 bgcolor=#d6d6d6
| 470166 ||  || — || October 21, 2006 || Kitt Peak || Spacewatch || — || align=right | 2.3 km || 
|-id=167 bgcolor=#fefefe
| 470167 ||  || — || October 16, 2006 || Catalina || CSS || — || align=right data-sort-value="0.75" | 750 m || 
|-id=168 bgcolor=#d6d6d6
| 470168 ||  || — || October 20, 2006 || Kitt Peak || Spacewatch || — || align=right | 2.8 km || 
|-id=169 bgcolor=#d6d6d6
| 470169 ||  || — || October 20, 2006 || Kitt Peak || Spacewatch || — || align=right | 2.0 km || 
|-id=170 bgcolor=#d6d6d6
| 470170 ||  || — || September 27, 2006 || Mount Lemmon || Mount Lemmon Survey || — || align=right | 2.3 km || 
|-id=171 bgcolor=#d6d6d6
| 470171 ||  || — || October 21, 2006 || Kitt Peak || Spacewatch || critical || align=right | 2.0 km || 
|-id=172 bgcolor=#fefefe
| 470172 ||  || — || September 18, 2006 || Catalina || CSS || (2076) || align=right data-sort-value="0.69" | 690 m || 
|-id=173 bgcolor=#d6d6d6
| 470173 ||  || — || September 26, 2006 || Mount Lemmon || Mount Lemmon Survey || — || align=right | 2.2 km || 
|-id=174 bgcolor=#fefefe
| 470174 ||  || — || October 13, 2006 || Kitt Peak || Spacewatch || H || align=right data-sort-value="0.71" | 710 m || 
|-id=175 bgcolor=#d6d6d6
| 470175 ||  || — || October 27, 2006 || Kitt Peak || Spacewatch || — || align=right | 2.2 km || 
|-id=176 bgcolor=#d6d6d6
| 470176 ||  || — || October 28, 2006 || Mount Lemmon || Mount Lemmon Survey || — || align=right | 2.5 km || 
|-id=177 bgcolor=#d6d6d6
| 470177 ||  || — || April 28, 2004 || Kitt Peak || Spacewatch || — || align=right | 3.1 km || 
|-id=178 bgcolor=#d6d6d6
| 470178 ||  || — || October 12, 2006 || Kitt Peak || Spacewatch || — || align=right | 2.4 km || 
|-id=179 bgcolor=#d6d6d6
| 470179 ||  || — || September 26, 2006 || Mount Lemmon || Mount Lemmon Survey || EOS || align=right | 1.6 km || 
|-id=180 bgcolor=#d6d6d6
| 470180 ||  || — || October 4, 2006 || Mount Lemmon || Mount Lemmon Survey || — || align=right | 2.2 km || 
|-id=181 bgcolor=#d6d6d6
| 470181 ||  || — || October 19, 2006 || Mount Lemmon || Mount Lemmon Survey || — || align=right | 2.2 km || 
|-id=182 bgcolor=#d6d6d6
| 470182 ||  || — || October 16, 2006 || Kitt Peak || Spacewatch || — || align=right | 2.0 km || 
|-id=183 bgcolor=#d6d6d6
| 470183 ||  || — || October 20, 2006 || Kitt Peak || Spacewatch || — || align=right | 2.3 km || 
|-id=184 bgcolor=#fefefe
| 470184 ||  || — || October 21, 2006 || Kitt Peak || Spacewatch || — || align=right data-sort-value="0.56" | 560 m || 
|-id=185 bgcolor=#fefefe
| 470185 ||  || — || November 10, 2006 || Kitt Peak || Spacewatch || V || align=right data-sort-value="0.45" | 450 m || 
|-id=186 bgcolor=#fefefe
| 470186 ||  || — || November 11, 2006 || Mount Lemmon || Mount Lemmon Survey || — || align=right data-sort-value="0.67" | 670 m || 
|-id=187 bgcolor=#FA8072
| 470187 ||  || — || November 13, 2006 || Catalina || CSS || H || align=right data-sort-value="0.64" | 640 m || 
|-id=188 bgcolor=#fefefe
| 470188 ||  || — || October 21, 2006 || Kitt Peak || Spacewatch || — || align=right data-sort-value="0.55" | 550 m || 
|-id=189 bgcolor=#d6d6d6
| 470189 ||  || — || November 9, 2006 || Kitt Peak || Spacewatch || — || align=right | 2.7 km || 
|-id=190 bgcolor=#d6d6d6
| 470190 ||  || — || October 27, 2006 || Mount Lemmon || Mount Lemmon Survey || — || align=right | 2.3 km || 
|-id=191 bgcolor=#fefefe
| 470191 ||  || — || September 27, 2006 || Mount Lemmon || Mount Lemmon Survey || (2076) || align=right data-sort-value="0.70" | 700 m || 
|-id=192 bgcolor=#fefefe
| 470192 ||  || — || October 12, 2006 || Kitt Peak || Spacewatch || — || align=right data-sort-value="0.64" | 640 m || 
|-id=193 bgcolor=#d6d6d6
| 470193 ||  || — || November 11, 2006 || Mount Lemmon || Mount Lemmon Survey || — || align=right | 2.9 km || 
|-id=194 bgcolor=#d6d6d6
| 470194 ||  || — || October 17, 2006 || Mount Lemmon || Mount Lemmon Survey || — || align=right | 2.3 km || 
|-id=195 bgcolor=#d6d6d6
| 470195 ||  || — || September 27, 2006 || Mount Lemmon || Mount Lemmon Survey || — || align=right | 3.0 km || 
|-id=196 bgcolor=#fefefe
| 470196 ||  || — || November 2, 2006 || Catalina || CSS || H || align=right data-sort-value="0.67" | 670 m || 
|-id=197 bgcolor=#d6d6d6
| 470197 ||  || — || October 20, 2006 || Mount Lemmon || Mount Lemmon Survey || — || align=right | 3.9 km || 
|-id=198 bgcolor=#d6d6d6
| 470198 ||  || — || November 10, 2006 || Kitt Peak || Spacewatch || — || align=right | 4.1 km || 
|-id=199 bgcolor=#d6d6d6
| 470199 ||  || — || November 11, 2006 || Kitt Peak || Spacewatch || — || align=right | 2.5 km || 
|-id=200 bgcolor=#d6d6d6
| 470200 ||  || — || September 28, 2006 || Mount Lemmon || Mount Lemmon Survey || — || align=right | 2.8 km || 
|}

470201–470300 

|-bgcolor=#fefefe
| 470201 ||  || — || November 11, 2006 || Kitt Peak || Spacewatch || — || align=right data-sort-value="0.70" | 700 m || 
|-id=202 bgcolor=#d6d6d6
| 470202 ||  || — || September 27, 2006 || Mount Lemmon || Mount Lemmon Survey || — || align=right | 3.1 km || 
|-id=203 bgcolor=#d6d6d6
| 470203 ||  || — || October 17, 2006 || Mount Lemmon || Mount Lemmon Survey || — || align=right | 4.5 km || 
|-id=204 bgcolor=#d6d6d6
| 470204 ||  || — || October 23, 2006 || Mount Lemmon || Mount Lemmon Survey || — || align=right | 2.1 km || 
|-id=205 bgcolor=#fefefe
| 470205 ||  || — || November 13, 2006 || Kitt Peak || Spacewatch || — || align=right data-sort-value="0.85" | 850 m || 
|-id=206 bgcolor=#fefefe
| 470206 ||  || — || November 13, 2006 || Kitt Peak || Spacewatch || — || align=right data-sort-value="0.82" | 820 m || 
|-id=207 bgcolor=#fefefe
| 470207 ||  || — || October 4, 2006 || Mount Lemmon || Mount Lemmon Survey || — || align=right data-sort-value="0.74" | 740 m || 
|-id=208 bgcolor=#d6d6d6
| 470208 ||  || — || September 28, 2006 || Mount Lemmon || Mount Lemmon Survey || — || align=right | 2.4 km || 
|-id=209 bgcolor=#fefefe
| 470209 ||  || — || November 14, 2006 || Socorro || LINEAR || — || align=right | 1.3 km || 
|-id=210 bgcolor=#d6d6d6
| 470210 ||  || — || November 1, 2006 || Mount Lemmon || Mount Lemmon Survey || — || align=right | 3.3 km || 
|-id=211 bgcolor=#d6d6d6
| 470211 ||  || — || November 11, 2006 || Kitt Peak || Spacewatch || — || align=right | 3.0 km || 
|-id=212 bgcolor=#d6d6d6
| 470212 ||  || — || November 17, 2006 || Mount Lemmon || Mount Lemmon Survey || — || align=right | 2.7 km || 
|-id=213 bgcolor=#fefefe
| 470213 ||  || — || November 17, 2006 || Mount Lemmon || Mount Lemmon Survey || — || align=right data-sort-value="0.80" | 800 m || 
|-id=214 bgcolor=#d6d6d6
| 470214 ||  || — || November 22, 2006 || Eskridge || Farpoint Obs. || — || align=right | 2.4 km || 
|-id=215 bgcolor=#FA8072
| 470215 ||  || — || November 22, 2006 || Siding Spring || SSS || — || align=right data-sort-value="0.95" | 950 m || 
|-id=216 bgcolor=#d6d6d6
| 470216 ||  || — || October 31, 2006 || Kitt Peak || Spacewatch || — || align=right | 3.2 km || 
|-id=217 bgcolor=#d6d6d6
| 470217 ||  || — || October 18, 2006 || Kitt Peak || Spacewatch || — || align=right | 2.5 km || 
|-id=218 bgcolor=#d6d6d6
| 470218 ||  || — || November 16, 2006 || Kitt Peak || Spacewatch || — || align=right | 3.3 km || 
|-id=219 bgcolor=#fefefe
| 470219 ||  || — || November 16, 2006 || Kitt Peak || Spacewatch || V || align=right data-sort-value="0.48" | 480 m || 
|-id=220 bgcolor=#d6d6d6
| 470220 ||  || — || September 28, 2006 || Mount Lemmon || Mount Lemmon Survey || — || align=right | 4.1 km || 
|-id=221 bgcolor=#d6d6d6
| 470221 ||  || — || November 18, 2006 || Kitt Peak || Spacewatch || — || align=right | 2.1 km || 
|-id=222 bgcolor=#d6d6d6
| 470222 ||  || — || October 23, 2006 || Mount Lemmon || Mount Lemmon Survey || — || align=right | 2.4 km || 
|-id=223 bgcolor=#d6d6d6
| 470223 ||  || — || November 11, 2006 || Kitt Peak || Spacewatch || — || align=right | 2.5 km || 
|-id=224 bgcolor=#d6d6d6
| 470224 ||  || — || November 19, 2006 || Kitt Peak || Spacewatch || — || align=right | 3.5 km || 
|-id=225 bgcolor=#d6d6d6
| 470225 ||  || — || November 19, 2006 || Kitt Peak || Spacewatch || — || align=right | 4.0 km || 
|-id=226 bgcolor=#d6d6d6
| 470226 ||  || — || November 19, 2006 || Socorro || LINEAR || — || align=right | 2.8 km || 
|-id=227 bgcolor=#E9E9E9
| 470227 ||  || — || November 19, 2006 || Socorro || LINEAR || — || align=right | 2.8 km || 
|-id=228 bgcolor=#d6d6d6
| 470228 ||  || — || October 28, 2006 || Mount Lemmon || Mount Lemmon Survey || HYG || align=right | 2.2 km || 
|-id=229 bgcolor=#d6d6d6
| 470229 ||  || — || November 19, 2006 || Kitt Peak || Spacewatch || — || align=right | 2.6 km || 
|-id=230 bgcolor=#fefefe
| 470230 ||  || — || September 27, 2006 || Mount Lemmon || Mount Lemmon Survey || — || align=right data-sort-value="0.68" | 680 m || 
|-id=231 bgcolor=#d6d6d6
| 470231 ||  || — || November 22, 2006 || Catalina || CSS || — || align=right | 2.7 km || 
|-id=232 bgcolor=#fefefe
| 470232 ||  || — || November 28, 2006 || Socorro || LINEAR || H || align=right data-sort-value="0.68" | 680 m || 
|-id=233 bgcolor=#d6d6d6
| 470233 ||  || — || October 21, 2006 || Mount Lemmon || Mount Lemmon Survey || — || align=right | 4.0 km || 
|-id=234 bgcolor=#d6d6d6
| 470234 ||  || — || November 22, 2006 || Catalina || CSS || — || align=right | 2.9 km || 
|-id=235 bgcolor=#fefefe
| 470235 ||  || — || November 11, 2006 || Kitt Peak || Spacewatch || — || align=right data-sort-value="0.54" | 540 m || 
|-id=236 bgcolor=#d6d6d6
| 470236 ||  || — || November 23, 2006 || Kitt Peak || Spacewatch || — || align=right | 2.8 km || 
|-id=237 bgcolor=#d6d6d6
| 470237 ||  || — || November 11, 2006 || Kitt Peak || Spacewatch || — || align=right | 2.8 km || 
|-id=238 bgcolor=#d6d6d6
| 470238 ||  || — || October 31, 2006 || Mount Lemmon || Mount Lemmon Survey || — || align=right | 2.5 km || 
|-id=239 bgcolor=#fefefe
| 470239 ||  || — || November 29, 2006 || Socorro || LINEAR || — || align=right data-sort-value="0.72" | 720 m || 
|-id=240 bgcolor=#d6d6d6
| 470240 ||  || — || November 23, 2006 || Kitt Peak || Spacewatch || — || align=right | 3.1 km || 
|-id=241 bgcolor=#fefefe
| 470241 ||  || — || October 23, 2006 || Mount Lemmon || Mount Lemmon Survey || — || align=right data-sort-value="0.80" | 800 m || 
|-id=242 bgcolor=#fefefe
| 470242 ||  || — || December 1, 2006 || Mount Lemmon || Mount Lemmon Survey || — || align=right data-sort-value="0.78" | 780 m || 
|-id=243 bgcolor=#d6d6d6
| 470243 ||  || — || November 18, 2006 || Mount Lemmon || Mount Lemmon Survey || — || align=right | 3.2 km || 
|-id=244 bgcolor=#d6d6d6
| 470244 ||  || — || November 18, 2006 || Kitt Peak || Spacewatch || — || align=right | 3.1 km || 
|-id=245 bgcolor=#fefefe
| 470245 ||  || — || December 15, 2006 || Mount Lemmon || Mount Lemmon Survey || — || align=right data-sort-value="0.76" | 760 m || 
|-id=246 bgcolor=#d6d6d6
| 470246 ||  || — || November 16, 2006 || Kitt Peak || Spacewatch || — || align=right | 3.5 km || 
|-id=247 bgcolor=#d6d6d6
| 470247 ||  || — || August 30, 2005 || Kitt Peak || Spacewatch || THM || align=right | 2.0 km || 
|-id=248 bgcolor=#d6d6d6
| 470248 ||  || — || October 23, 2006 || Mount Lemmon || Mount Lemmon Survey || — || align=right | 3.9 km || 
|-id=249 bgcolor=#fefefe
| 470249 ||  || — || December 11, 2006 || Kitt Peak || Spacewatch || — || align=right data-sort-value="0.68" | 680 m || 
|-id=250 bgcolor=#fefefe
| 470250 ||  || — || December 12, 2006 || Kitt Peak || Spacewatch || — || align=right data-sort-value="0.82" | 820 m || 
|-id=251 bgcolor=#fefefe
| 470251 ||  || — || November 24, 2006 || Kitt Peak || Spacewatch || — || align=right data-sort-value="0.61" | 610 m || 
|-id=252 bgcolor=#d6d6d6
| 470252 ||  || — || December 20, 2006 || Palomar || NEAT || — || align=right | 2.9 km || 
|-id=253 bgcolor=#fefefe
| 470253 ||  || — || December 21, 2006 || Kitt Peak || Spacewatch || — || align=right data-sort-value="0.62" | 620 m || 
|-id=254 bgcolor=#fefefe
| 470254 ||  || — || December 21, 2006 || Kitt Peak || Spacewatch || — || align=right data-sort-value="0.64" | 640 m || 
|-id=255 bgcolor=#d6d6d6
| 470255 ||  || — || November 1, 2006 || Mount Lemmon || Mount Lemmon Survey || — || align=right | 2.7 km || 
|-id=256 bgcolor=#fefefe
| 470256 ||  || — || December 23, 2006 || Catalina || CSS || — || align=right | 1.3 km || 
|-id=257 bgcolor=#fefefe
| 470257 ||  || — || December 26, 2006 || Kitt Peak || Spacewatch || H || align=right data-sort-value="0.64" | 640 m || 
|-id=258 bgcolor=#FA8072
| 470258 ||  || — || December 25, 2006 || Catalina || CSS || — || align=right data-sort-value="0.87" | 870 m || 
|-id=259 bgcolor=#fefefe
| 470259 ||  || — || December 14, 2006 || Kitt Peak || Spacewatch || H || align=right data-sort-value="0.75" | 750 m || 
|-id=260 bgcolor=#E9E9E9
| 470260 ||  || — || January 8, 2007 || Mount Lemmon || Mount Lemmon Survey || — || align=right | 1.0 km || 
|-id=261 bgcolor=#fefefe
| 470261 ||  || — || January 10, 2007 || Mount Lemmon || Mount Lemmon Survey || H || align=right data-sort-value="0.94" | 940 m || 
|-id=262 bgcolor=#d6d6d6
| 470262 ||  || — || January 8, 2007 || Mount Lemmon || Mount Lemmon Survey || — || align=right | 3.9 km || 
|-id=263 bgcolor=#fefefe
| 470263 ||  || — || January 9, 2007 || Mount Lemmon || Mount Lemmon Survey || H || align=right data-sort-value="0.75" | 750 m || 
|-id=264 bgcolor=#d6d6d6
| 470264 ||  || — || December 26, 2006 || Kitt Peak || Spacewatch || Tj (2.99) || align=right | 3.5 km || 
|-id=265 bgcolor=#fefefe
| 470265 ||  || — || January 17, 2007 || Catalina || CSS || H || align=right data-sort-value="0.92" | 920 m || 
|-id=266 bgcolor=#fefefe
| 470266 ||  || — || January 24, 2007 || Mount Lemmon || Mount Lemmon Survey || — || align=right data-sort-value="0.95" | 950 m || 
|-id=267 bgcolor=#d6d6d6
| 470267 ||  || — || January 24, 2007 || Catalina || CSS || — || align=right | 3.2 km || 
|-id=268 bgcolor=#fefefe
| 470268 ||  || — || January 9, 2007 || Mount Lemmon || Mount Lemmon Survey || H || align=right data-sort-value="0.62" | 620 m || 
|-id=269 bgcolor=#fefefe
| 470269 ||  || — || November 16, 2006 || Mount Lemmon || Mount Lemmon Survey || — || align=right | 1.0 km || 
|-id=270 bgcolor=#d6d6d6
| 470270 ||  || — || November 16, 2006 || Catalina || CSS || Tj (2.93) || align=right | 4.5 km || 
|-id=271 bgcolor=#fefefe
| 470271 ||  || — || January 9, 2007 || Mount Lemmon || Mount Lemmon Survey || H || align=right data-sort-value="0.74" | 740 m || 
|-id=272 bgcolor=#d6d6d6
| 470272 ||  || — || January 27, 2007 || Kitt Peak || Spacewatch || — || align=right | 2.5 km || 
|-id=273 bgcolor=#fefefe
| 470273 ||  || — || January 17, 2007 || Kitt Peak || Spacewatch || — || align=right data-sort-value="0.85" | 850 m || 
|-id=274 bgcolor=#d6d6d6
| 470274 ||  || — || January 27, 2007 || Mount Lemmon || Mount Lemmon Survey || — || align=right | 2.5 km || 
|-id=275 bgcolor=#d6d6d6
| 470275 ||  || — || January 15, 2007 || Catalina || CSS || — || align=right | 3.5 km || 
|-id=276 bgcolor=#fefefe
| 470276 ||  || — || February 10, 2007 || Catalina || CSS || H || align=right data-sort-value="0.78" | 780 m || 
|-id=277 bgcolor=#fefefe
| 470277 ||  || — || February 15, 2007 || Palomar || NEAT || H || align=right data-sort-value="0.78" | 780 m || 
|-id=278 bgcolor=#fefefe
| 470278 ||  || — || November 15, 2006 || Mount Lemmon || Mount Lemmon Survey || — || align=right data-sort-value="0.91" | 910 m || 
|-id=279 bgcolor=#fefefe
| 470279 ||  || — || January 17, 2007 || Catalina || CSS || H || align=right data-sort-value="0.57" | 570 m || 
|-id=280 bgcolor=#E9E9E9
| 470280 ||  || — || February 8, 2007 || Kitt Peak || Spacewatch || — || align=right data-sort-value="0.88" | 880 m || 
|-id=281 bgcolor=#fefefe
| 470281 ||  || — || February 19, 2007 || Mount Lemmon || Mount Lemmon Survey || — || align=right data-sort-value="0.76" | 760 m || 
|-id=282 bgcolor=#d6d6d6
| 470282 ||  || — || December 21, 2006 || Mount Lemmon || Mount Lemmon Survey || Tj (2.99) || align=right | 3.3 km || 
|-id=283 bgcolor=#FA8072
| 470283 ||  || — || February 22, 2007 || Catalina || CSS || — || align=right data-sort-value="0.79" | 790 m || 
|-id=284 bgcolor=#fefefe
| 470284 ||  || — || March 11, 2007 || Anderson Mesa || LONEOS || — || align=right | 1.1 km || 
|-id=285 bgcolor=#E9E9E9
| 470285 ||  || — || March 12, 2007 || Catalina || CSS || — || align=right | 2.1 km || 
|-id=286 bgcolor=#E9E9E9
| 470286 ||  || — || March 13, 2007 || Mount Lemmon || Mount Lemmon Survey || JUN || align=right data-sort-value="0.90" | 900 m || 
|-id=287 bgcolor=#E9E9E9
| 470287 ||  || — || March 10, 2007 || Kitt Peak || Spacewatch || — || align=right data-sort-value="0.82" | 820 m || 
|-id=288 bgcolor=#fefefe
| 470288 ||  || — || March 10, 2007 || Palomar || NEAT || — || align=right data-sort-value="0.93" | 930 m || 
|-id=289 bgcolor=#E9E9E9
| 470289 ||  || — || March 10, 2007 || Mount Lemmon || Mount Lemmon Survey || — || align=right | 1.4 km || 
|-id=290 bgcolor=#fefefe
| 470290 ||  || — || January 27, 2007 || Mount Lemmon || Mount Lemmon Survey || — || align=right data-sort-value="0.89" | 890 m || 
|-id=291 bgcolor=#E9E9E9
| 470291 ||  || — || February 26, 2007 || Mount Lemmon || Mount Lemmon Survey || — || align=right data-sort-value="0.71" | 710 m || 
|-id=292 bgcolor=#fefefe
| 470292 ||  || — || March 12, 2007 || Mount Lemmon || Mount Lemmon Survey || NYS || align=right data-sort-value="0.67" | 670 m || 
|-id=293 bgcolor=#E9E9E9
| 470293 ||  || — || March 15, 2007 || Kitt Peak || Spacewatch || — || align=right | 1.2 km || 
|-id=294 bgcolor=#E9E9E9
| 470294 ||  || — || March 25, 2007 || Catalina || CSS || — || align=right | 1.8 km || 
|-id=295 bgcolor=#E9E9E9
| 470295 ||  || — || March 14, 2007 || Kitt Peak || Spacewatch || — || align=right | 1.5 km || 
|-id=296 bgcolor=#E9E9E9
| 470296 ||  || — || March 11, 2007 || Catalina || CSS || — || align=right | 2.0 km || 
|-id=297 bgcolor=#E9E9E9
| 470297 ||  || — || April 11, 2007 || Kitt Peak || Spacewatch || — || align=right data-sort-value="0.85" | 850 m || 
|-id=298 bgcolor=#E9E9E9
| 470298 ||  || — || March 15, 2007 || Mount Lemmon || Mount Lemmon Survey || — || align=right | 1.1 km || 
|-id=299 bgcolor=#E9E9E9
| 470299 ||  || — || April 14, 2007 || Kitt Peak || Spacewatch || — || align=right data-sort-value="0.73" | 730 m || 
|-id=300 bgcolor=#E9E9E9
| 470300 ||  || — || April 14, 2007 || Kitt Peak || Spacewatch || — || align=right | 1.1 km || 
|}

470301–470400 

|-bgcolor=#E9E9E9
| 470301 ||  || — || April 15, 2007 || Kitt Peak || Spacewatch || — || align=right | 1.4 km || 
|-id=302 bgcolor=#E9E9E9
| 470302 ||  || — || April 20, 2007 || Kitt Peak || Spacewatch || — || align=right data-sort-value="0.81" | 810 m || 
|-id=303 bgcolor=#E9E9E9
| 470303 ||  || — || April 20, 2007 || Kitt Peak || Spacewatch || MRX || align=right | 1.1 km || 
|-id=304 bgcolor=#E9E9E9
| 470304 ||  || — || April 25, 2007 || Kitt Peak || Spacewatch || — || align=right | 1.3 km || 
|-id=305 bgcolor=#E9E9E9
| 470305 ||  || — || April 25, 2007 || Mount Lemmon || Mount Lemmon Survey || — || align=right | 1.5 km || 
|-id=306 bgcolor=#E9E9E9
| 470306 ||  || — || May 7, 2007 || Kitt Peak || Spacewatch || — || align=right | 1.2 km || 
|-id=307 bgcolor=#E9E9E9
| 470307 ||  || — || May 10, 2007 || Anderson Mesa || LONEOS || — || align=right | 1.3 km || 
|-id=308 bgcolor=#C2E0FF
| 470308 ||  || — || May 10, 2007 || Palomar || Palomar Obs. || plutino?critical || align=right | 558 km || 
|-id=309 bgcolor=#C2E0FF
| 470309 ||  || — || May 10, 2007 || Palomar || Palomar Obs. || centaurcritical || align=right | 154 km || 
|-id=310 bgcolor=#FFC2E0
| 470310 ||  || — || June 13, 2007 || Catalina || CSS || ATEPHAcritical || align=right data-sort-value="0.47" | 470 m || 
|-id=311 bgcolor=#E9E9E9
| 470311 ||  || — || May 11, 2007 || Kitt Peak || Spacewatch || — || align=right | 1.9 km || 
|-id=312 bgcolor=#E9E9E9
| 470312 ||  || — || April 26, 2007 || Mount Lemmon || Mount Lemmon Survey || — || align=right | 1.5 km || 
|-id=313 bgcolor=#E9E9E9
| 470313 ||  || — || June 16, 2007 || Kitt Peak || Spacewatch || — || align=right | 1.7 km || 
|-id=314 bgcolor=#E9E9E9
| 470314 ||  || — || April 25, 2007 || Mount Lemmon || Mount Lemmon Survey || ADE || align=right | 1.8 km || 
|-id=315 bgcolor=#E9E9E9
| 470315 ||  || — || June 9, 2007 || Siding Spring || SSS || — || align=right | 1.8 km || 
|-id=316 bgcolor=#C2E0FF
| 470316 ||  || — || July 22, 2007 || Palomar || Palomar Obs. || SDO || align=right | 391 km || 
|-id=317 bgcolor=#FA8072
| 470317 ||  || — || July 19, 2007 || Socorro || LINEAR || — || align=right | 2.3 km || 
|-id=318 bgcolor=#E9E9E9
| 470318 ||  || — || August 12, 2007 || Socorro || LINEAR || — || align=right | 2.1 km || 
|-id=319 bgcolor=#E9E9E9
| 470319 ||  || — || August 13, 2007 || Socorro || LINEAR || EUN || align=right | 1.4 km || 
|-id=320 bgcolor=#E9E9E9
| 470320 ||  || — || August 10, 2007 || Kitt Peak || Spacewatch || — || align=right | 2.0 km || 
|-id=321 bgcolor=#E9E9E9
| 470321 ||  || — || August 10, 2007 || Kitt Peak || Spacewatch || HOF || align=right | 2.2 km || 
|-id=322 bgcolor=#E9E9E9
| 470322 ||  || — || August 10, 2007 || Kitt Peak || Spacewatch || — || align=right | 1.8 km || 
|-id=323 bgcolor=#E9E9E9
| 470323 ||  || — || August 10, 2007 || Kitt Peak || Spacewatch || — || align=right | 1.7 km || 
|-id=324 bgcolor=#E9E9E9
| 470324 ||  || — || August 16, 2007 || San Marcello || Pistoia Mountains Obs. || — || align=right | 2.5 km || 
|-id=325 bgcolor=#E9E9E9
| 470325 ||  || — || August 21, 2007 || Anderson Mesa || LONEOS || — || align=right | 2.0 km || 
|-id=326 bgcolor=#E9E9E9
| 470326 ||  || — || September 1, 2007 || Siding Spring || K. Sárneczky, L. Kiss || — || align=right | 2.4 km || 
|-id=327 bgcolor=#E9E9E9
| 470327 ||  || — || September 5, 2007 || La Sagra || OAM Obs. || — || align=right | 2.4 km || 
|-id=328 bgcolor=#E9E9E9
| 470328 ||  || — || September 10, 2007 || Dauban || Chante-Perdrix Obs. || — || align=right | 2.4 km || 
|-id=329 bgcolor=#E9E9E9
| 470329 ||  || — || September 2, 2007 || Catalina || CSS || — || align=right | 2.1 km || 
|-id=330 bgcolor=#E9E9E9
| 470330 ||  || — || September 4, 2007 || Mount Lemmon || Mount Lemmon Survey || — || align=right | 1.9 km || 
|-id=331 bgcolor=#E9E9E9
| 470331 ||  || — || September 5, 2007 || Catalina || CSS || — || align=right | 2.2 km || 
|-id=332 bgcolor=#E9E9E9
| 470332 ||  || — || September 5, 2007 || Anderson Mesa || LONEOS || — || align=right | 3.8 km || 
|-id=333 bgcolor=#E9E9E9
| 470333 ||  || — || September 6, 2007 || Anderson Mesa || LONEOS || DOR || align=right | 2.2 km || 
|-id=334 bgcolor=#E9E9E9
| 470334 ||  || — || September 5, 2007 || Catalina || CSS || — || align=right | 1.9 km || 
|-id=335 bgcolor=#E9E9E9
| 470335 ||  || — || September 9, 2007 || Mount Lemmon || Mount Lemmon Survey || — || align=right | 1.5 km || 
|-id=336 bgcolor=#E9E9E9
| 470336 ||  || — || September 9, 2007 || Kitt Peak || Spacewatch || — || align=right | 2.0 km || 
|-id=337 bgcolor=#E9E9E9
| 470337 ||  || — || September 9, 2007 || Kitt Peak || Spacewatch || — || align=right | 1.9 km || 
|-id=338 bgcolor=#E9E9E9
| 470338 ||  || — || September 10, 2007 || Mount Lemmon || Mount Lemmon Survey || — || align=right | 1.4 km || 
|-id=339 bgcolor=#E9E9E9
| 470339 ||  || — || September 10, 2007 || Kitt Peak || Spacewatch || — || align=right | 2.9 km || 
|-id=340 bgcolor=#E9E9E9
| 470340 ||  || — || September 11, 2007 || Kitt Peak || Spacewatch || — || align=right | 2.1 km || 
|-id=341 bgcolor=#E9E9E9
| 470341 ||  || — || September 11, 2007 || Purple Mountain || PMO NEO || — || align=right | 2.3 km || 
|-id=342 bgcolor=#E9E9E9
| 470342 ||  || — || September 12, 2007 || Anderson Mesa || LONEOS || — || align=right | 1.8 km || 
|-id=343 bgcolor=#E9E9E9
| 470343 ||  || — || August 21, 2007 || Anderson Mesa || LONEOS || — || align=right | 2.0 km || 
|-id=344 bgcolor=#E9E9E9
| 470344 ||  || — || September 10, 2007 || Kitt Peak || Spacewatch || — || align=right | 2.3 km || 
|-id=345 bgcolor=#E9E9E9
| 470345 ||  || — || September 10, 2007 || Kitt Peak || Spacewatch || — || align=right | 1.9 km || 
|-id=346 bgcolor=#E9E9E9
| 470346 ||  || — || September 10, 2007 || Kitt Peak || Spacewatch || — || align=right | 2.6 km || 
|-id=347 bgcolor=#d6d6d6
| 470347 ||  || — || September 10, 2007 || Kitt Peak || Spacewatch || — || align=right | 2.1 km || 
|-id=348 bgcolor=#E9E9E9
| 470348 ||  || — || September 11, 2007 || Catalina || CSS || — || align=right | 3.1 km || 
|-id=349 bgcolor=#E9E9E9
| 470349 ||  || — || September 12, 2007 || Anderson Mesa || LONEOS || MRX || align=right | 1.0 km || 
|-id=350 bgcolor=#E9E9E9
| 470350 ||  || — || September 8, 2007 || Mount Lemmon || Mount Lemmon Survey || — || align=right | 2.4 km || 
|-id=351 bgcolor=#E9E9E9
| 470351 ||  || — || September 10, 2007 || Kitt Peak || Spacewatch || — || align=right | 1.9 km || 
|-id=352 bgcolor=#E9E9E9
| 470352 ||  || — || August 23, 2007 || Kitt Peak || Spacewatch || — || align=right | 1.7 km || 
|-id=353 bgcolor=#E9E9E9
| 470353 ||  || — || September 15, 2007 || Kitt Peak || Spacewatch || — || align=right | 2.4 km || 
|-id=354 bgcolor=#E9E9E9
| 470354 ||  || — || September 11, 2007 || Kitt Peak || Spacewatch || — || align=right | 1.7 km || 
|-id=355 bgcolor=#E9E9E9
| 470355 ||  || — || September 13, 2007 || Mount Lemmon || Mount Lemmon Survey || — || align=right | 2.0 km || 
|-id=356 bgcolor=#E9E9E9
| 470356 ||  || — || September 4, 2007 || Catalina || CSS || AEO || align=right | 1.2 km || 
|-id=357 bgcolor=#E9E9E9
| 470357 ||  || — || September 12, 2007 || Catalina || CSS || — || align=right | 2.1 km || 
|-id=358 bgcolor=#d6d6d6
| 470358 ||  || — || September 15, 2007 || Mount Lemmon || Mount Lemmon Survey || — || align=right | 2.9 km || 
|-id=359 bgcolor=#E9E9E9
| 470359 ||  || — || September 18, 2007 || Socorro || LINEAR || — || align=right | 2.3 km || 
|-id=360 bgcolor=#E9E9E9
| 470360 ||  || — || August 11, 2007 || Socorro || LINEAR || — || align=right | 3.4 km || 
|-id=361 bgcolor=#E9E9E9
| 470361 ||  || — || September 19, 2007 || Kitt Peak || Spacewatch || — || align=right | 2.4 km || 
|-id=362 bgcolor=#E9E9E9
| 470362 ||  || — || September 18, 2007 || Kitt Peak || Spacewatch || — || align=right | 2.2 km || 
|-id=363 bgcolor=#d6d6d6
| 470363 ||  || — || September 25, 2007 || Mount Lemmon || Mount Lemmon Survey || EOS || align=right | 2.4 km || 
|-id=364 bgcolor=#E9E9E9
| 470364 ||  || — || September 9, 2007 || Anderson Mesa || LONEOS || — || align=right | 2.0 km || 
|-id=365 bgcolor=#E9E9E9
| 470365 ||  || — || October 4, 2007 || Kitt Peak || Spacewatch || — || align=right | 1.7 km || 
|-id=366 bgcolor=#d6d6d6
| 470366 ||  || — || October 4, 2007 || Kitt Peak || Spacewatch || — || align=right | 2.8 km || 
|-id=367 bgcolor=#FA8072
| 470367 ||  || — || June 21, 2007 || Mount Lemmon || Mount Lemmon Survey || — || align=right | 1.9 km || 
|-id=368 bgcolor=#d6d6d6
| 470368 ||  || — || October 8, 2007 || Mount Lemmon || Mount Lemmon Survey || — || align=right | 2.2 km || 
|-id=369 bgcolor=#E9E9E9
| 470369 ||  || — || October 8, 2007 || Mount Lemmon || Mount Lemmon Survey || — || align=right | 2.3 km || 
|-id=370 bgcolor=#E9E9E9
| 470370 ||  || — || September 12, 2007 || Catalina || CSS || — || align=right | 2.5 km || 
|-id=371 bgcolor=#E9E9E9
| 470371 ||  || — || October 9, 2007 || Catalina || CSS || — || align=right | 2.5 km || 
|-id=372 bgcolor=#d6d6d6
| 470372 ||  || — || September 15, 2007 || Mount Lemmon || Mount Lemmon Survey || — || align=right | 2.5 km || 
|-id=373 bgcolor=#E9E9E9
| 470373 ||  || — || October 7, 2007 || Mount Lemmon || Mount Lemmon Survey || AGN || align=right | 1.4 km || 
|-id=374 bgcolor=#E9E9E9
| 470374 ||  || — || October 6, 2007 || Socorro || LINEAR || — || align=right | 2.1 km || 
|-id=375 bgcolor=#E9E9E9
| 470375 ||  || — || October 12, 2007 || Socorro || LINEAR || DOR || align=right | 2.3 km || 
|-id=376 bgcolor=#d6d6d6
| 470376 ||  || — || October 5, 2007 || Kitt Peak || Spacewatch || — || align=right | 2.6 km || 
|-id=377 bgcolor=#E9E9E9
| 470377 ||  || — || October 7, 2007 || Mount Lemmon || Mount Lemmon Survey || — || align=right | 1.9 km || 
|-id=378 bgcolor=#E9E9E9
| 470378 ||  || — || October 8, 2007 || Kitt Peak || Spacewatch || — || align=right | 1.9 km || 
|-id=379 bgcolor=#d6d6d6
| 470379 ||  || — || October 10, 2007 || Charleston || ARO || — || align=right | 1.9 km || 
|-id=380 bgcolor=#E9E9E9
| 470380 ||  || — || October 10, 2007 || Mount Lemmon || Mount Lemmon Survey || — || align=right | 2.0 km || 
|-id=381 bgcolor=#E9E9E9
| 470381 ||  || — || October 12, 2007 || Catalina || CSS || — || align=right | 2.1 km || 
|-id=382 bgcolor=#d6d6d6
| 470382 ||  || — || October 8, 2007 || Kitt Peak || Spacewatch || — || align=right | 2.2 km || 
|-id=383 bgcolor=#E9E9E9
| 470383 ||  || — || October 11, 2007 || Mount Lemmon || Mount Lemmon Survey || — || align=right | 1.8 km || 
|-id=384 bgcolor=#d6d6d6
| 470384 ||  || — || October 12, 2007 || Kitt Peak || Spacewatch || KOR || align=right | 1.3 km || 
|-id=385 bgcolor=#E9E9E9
| 470385 ||  || — || October 11, 2007 || Kitt Peak || Spacewatch || — || align=right | 1.9 km || 
|-id=386 bgcolor=#d6d6d6
| 470386 ||  || — || October 11, 2007 || Kitt Peak || Spacewatch || — || align=right | 2.2 km || 
|-id=387 bgcolor=#E9E9E9
| 470387 ||  || — || October 11, 2007 || Kitt Peak || Spacewatch || — || align=right | 2.1 km || 
|-id=388 bgcolor=#d6d6d6
| 470388 ||  || — || October 11, 2007 || Kitt Peak || Spacewatch || — || align=right | 2.1 km || 
|-id=389 bgcolor=#d6d6d6
| 470389 ||  || — || October 13, 2007 || Mount Lemmon || Mount Lemmon Survey || — || align=right | 2.5 km || 
|-id=390 bgcolor=#d6d6d6
| 470390 ||  || — || October 12, 2007 || Catalina || CSS || — || align=right | 4.0 km || 
|-id=391 bgcolor=#d6d6d6
| 470391 ||  || — || October 14, 2007 || Kitt Peak || Spacewatch || — || align=right | 1.8 km || 
|-id=392 bgcolor=#E9E9E9
| 470392 ||  || — || September 15, 2007 || Catalina || CSS || — || align=right | 3.9 km || 
|-id=393 bgcolor=#d6d6d6
| 470393 ||  || — || October 8, 2007 || Mount Lemmon || Mount Lemmon Survey || — || align=right | 2.0 km || 
|-id=394 bgcolor=#E9E9E9
| 470394 ||  || — || October 15, 2007 || Kitt Peak || Spacewatch || — || align=right | 2.5 km || 
|-id=395 bgcolor=#E9E9E9
| 470395 ||  || — || October 9, 2007 || Catalina || CSS || — || align=right | 2.8 km || 
|-id=396 bgcolor=#d6d6d6
| 470396 ||  || — || October 12, 2007 || Mount Lemmon || Mount Lemmon Survey || 615 || align=right | 1.3 km || 
|-id=397 bgcolor=#d6d6d6
| 470397 ||  || — || October 10, 2007 || Mount Lemmon || Mount Lemmon Survey || — || align=right | 2.4 km || 
|-id=398 bgcolor=#d6d6d6
| 470398 ||  || — || October 9, 2007 || Kitt Peak || Spacewatch || — || align=right | 3.2 km || 
|-id=399 bgcolor=#fefefe
| 470399 ||  || — || October 8, 2007 || Mount Lemmon || Mount Lemmon Survey || — || align=right data-sort-value="0.85" | 850 m || 
|-id=400 bgcolor=#E9E9E9
| 470400 ||  || — || October 19, 2007 || Kitt Peak || Spacewatch || — || align=right | 2.2 km || 
|}

470401–470500 

|-bgcolor=#d6d6d6
| 470401 ||  || — || October 16, 2007 || Kitt Peak || Spacewatch || — || align=right | 2.2 km || 
|-id=402 bgcolor=#d6d6d6
| 470402 ||  || — || October 17, 2007 || Mount Lemmon || Mount Lemmon Survey || — || align=right | 2.4 km || 
|-id=403 bgcolor=#d6d6d6
| 470403 ||  || — || October 30, 2007 || Mount Lemmon || Mount Lemmon Survey || KOR || align=right | 1.2 km || 
|-id=404 bgcolor=#d6d6d6
| 470404 ||  || — || October 10, 2007 || Kitt Peak || Spacewatch || KOR || align=right | 1.3 km || 
|-id=405 bgcolor=#fefefe
| 470405 ||  || — || October 30, 2007 || Kitt Peak || Spacewatch || — || align=right data-sort-value="0.56" | 560 m || 
|-id=406 bgcolor=#d6d6d6
| 470406 ||  || — || October 17, 2007 || Mount Lemmon || Mount Lemmon Survey || — || align=right | 1.9 km || 
|-id=407 bgcolor=#d6d6d6
| 470407 ||  || — || October 30, 2007 || Kitt Peak || Spacewatch || KOR || align=right | 1.1 km || 
|-id=408 bgcolor=#fefefe
| 470408 ||  || — || October 30, 2007 || Kitt Peak || Spacewatch || — || align=right data-sort-value="0.57" | 570 m || 
|-id=409 bgcolor=#d6d6d6
| 470409 ||  || — || October 16, 2007 || Mount Lemmon || Mount Lemmon Survey || — || align=right | 2.7 km || 
|-id=410 bgcolor=#E9E9E9
| 470410 ||  || — || October 19, 2007 || Anderson Mesa || LONEOS || — || align=right | 2.5 km || 
|-id=411 bgcolor=#d6d6d6
| 470411 ||  || — || October 30, 2007 || Kitt Peak || Spacewatch || KOR || align=right | 1.2 km || 
|-id=412 bgcolor=#d6d6d6
| 470412 ||  || — || October 17, 2007 || Mount Lemmon || Mount Lemmon Survey || — || align=right | 3.2 km || 
|-id=413 bgcolor=#d6d6d6
| 470413 ||  || — || September 15, 2007 || Mount Lemmon || Mount Lemmon Survey || — || align=right | 2.5 km || 
|-id=414 bgcolor=#d6d6d6
| 470414 ||  || — || October 11, 2007 || Kitt Peak || Spacewatch || — || align=right | 1.8 km || 
|-id=415 bgcolor=#fefefe
| 470415 ||  || — || November 1, 2007 || Kitt Peak || Spacewatch || — || align=right data-sort-value="0.72" | 720 m || 
|-id=416 bgcolor=#fefefe
| 470416 ||  || — || November 2, 2007 || Catalina || CSS || — || align=right data-sort-value="0.97" | 970 m || 
|-id=417 bgcolor=#E9E9E9
| 470417 ||  || — || November 2, 2007 || Socorro || LINEAR || — || align=right | 2.8 km || 
|-id=418 bgcolor=#E9E9E9
| 470418 ||  || — || October 8, 2007 || Catalina || CSS || — || align=right | 1.9 km || 
|-id=419 bgcolor=#d6d6d6
| 470419 ||  || — || October 16, 2007 || Mount Lemmon || Mount Lemmon Survey || — || align=right | 2.6 km || 
|-id=420 bgcolor=#d6d6d6
| 470420 ||  || — || August 29, 2006 || Kitt Peak || Spacewatch || — || align=right | 2.7 km || 
|-id=421 bgcolor=#fefefe
| 470421 ||  || — || November 5, 2007 || Kitt Peak || Spacewatch || — || align=right data-sort-value="0.78" | 780 m || 
|-id=422 bgcolor=#E9E9E9
| 470422 ||  || — || November 2, 2007 || Catalina || CSS || — || align=right | 1.7 km || 
|-id=423 bgcolor=#d6d6d6
| 470423 ||  || — || November 7, 2007 || Charleston || ARO || KOR || align=right | 1.2 km || 
|-id=424 bgcolor=#d6d6d6
| 470424 ||  || — || September 10, 2007 || Mount Lemmon || Mount Lemmon Survey || — || align=right | 3.0 km || 
|-id=425 bgcolor=#E9E9E9
| 470425 ||  || — || September 21, 2007 || XuYi || PMO NEO || — || align=right | 2.4 km || 
|-id=426 bgcolor=#E9E9E9
| 470426 ||  || — || October 12, 2007 || Anderson Mesa || LONEOS || — || align=right | 2.5 km || 
|-id=427 bgcolor=#E9E9E9
| 470427 ||  || — || October 9, 2007 || Catalina || CSS || — || align=right | 3.5 km || 
|-id=428 bgcolor=#d6d6d6
| 470428 ||  || — || October 12, 2007 || Mount Lemmon || Mount Lemmon Survey || — || align=right | 2.4 km || 
|-id=429 bgcolor=#d6d6d6
| 470429 ||  || — || October 10, 2007 || Mount Lemmon || Mount Lemmon Survey || — || align=right | 2.7 km || 
|-id=430 bgcolor=#d6d6d6
| 470430 ||  || — || October 31, 2007 || Mount Lemmon || Mount Lemmon Survey || — || align=right | 24 km || 
|-id=431 bgcolor=#d6d6d6
| 470431 ||  || — || November 2, 2007 || Catalina || CSS || — || align=right | 3.0 km || 
|-id=432 bgcolor=#d6d6d6
| 470432 ||  || — || November 9, 2007 || Catalina || CSS || — || align=right | 3.5 km || 
|-id=433 bgcolor=#d6d6d6
| 470433 ||  || — || November 8, 2007 || Kitt Peak || Spacewatch || — || align=right | 3.7 km || 
|-id=434 bgcolor=#d6d6d6
| 470434 ||  || — || November 2, 2007 || Socorro || LINEAR || — || align=right | 2.7 km || 
|-id=435 bgcolor=#d6d6d6
| 470435 ||  || — || November 8, 2007 || Mount Lemmon || Mount Lemmon Survey || — || align=right | 3.3 km || 
|-id=436 bgcolor=#d6d6d6
| 470436 ||  || — || November 11, 2007 || Mount Lemmon || Mount Lemmon Survey || EOS || align=right | 2.1 km || 
|-id=437 bgcolor=#d6d6d6
| 470437 ||  || — || November 18, 2007 || Mount Lemmon || Mount Lemmon Survey || — || align=right | 2.3 km || 
|-id=438 bgcolor=#E9E9E9
| 470438 ||  || — || November 17, 2007 || Kitt Peak || Spacewatch || — || align=right | 2.5 km || 
|-id=439 bgcolor=#d6d6d6
| 470439 ||  || — || November 2, 2007 || Kitt Peak || Spacewatch || — || align=right | 2.8 km || 
|-id=440 bgcolor=#d6d6d6
| 470440 ||  || — || August 22, 2007 || Kitt Peak || Spacewatch || — || align=right | 3.2 km || 
|-id=441 bgcolor=#d6d6d6
| 470441 ||  || — || October 10, 2007 || Kitt Peak || Spacewatch || — || align=right | 1.8 km || 
|-id=442 bgcolor=#d6d6d6
| 470442 ||  || — || December 15, 2007 || Kitt Peak || Spacewatch || — || align=right | 2.2 km || 
|-id=443 bgcolor=#C2E0FF
| 470443 ||  || — || December 13, 2007 || Palomar || Palomar Obs. || other TNO || align=right | 528 km || 
|-id=444 bgcolor=#fefefe
| 470444 ||  || — || December 17, 2007 || Kitt Peak || Spacewatch || — || align=right data-sort-value="0.73" | 730 m || 
|-id=445 bgcolor=#d6d6d6
| 470445 ||  || — || December 5, 2007 || Kitt Peak || Spacewatch || EOS || align=right | 1.9 km || 
|-id=446 bgcolor=#fefefe
| 470446 ||  || — || December 16, 2007 || Mount Lemmon || Mount Lemmon Survey || — || align=right data-sort-value="0.66" | 660 m || 
|-id=447 bgcolor=#d6d6d6
| 470447 ||  || — || December 16, 2007 || Kitt Peak || Spacewatch || — || align=right | 1.9 km || 
|-id=448 bgcolor=#d6d6d6
| 470448 ||  || — || December 18, 2007 || Catalina || CSS || — || align=right | 3.8 km || 
|-id=449 bgcolor=#d6d6d6
| 470449 ||  || — || December 18, 2007 || Kitt Peak || Spacewatch || — || align=right | 2.4 km || 
|-id=450 bgcolor=#d6d6d6
| 470450 ||  || — || November 11, 2007 || Mount Lemmon || Mount Lemmon Survey || — || align=right | 3.2 km || 
|-id=451 bgcolor=#d6d6d6
| 470451 ||  || — || December 17, 2007 || Kitt Peak || Spacewatch || EOS || align=right | 1.8 km || 
|-id=452 bgcolor=#d6d6d6
| 470452 ||  || — || December 30, 2007 || Mount Lemmon || Mount Lemmon Survey || — || align=right | 4.7 km || 
|-id=453 bgcolor=#d6d6d6
| 470453 ||  || — || December 17, 2007 || Kitt Peak || Spacewatch || — || align=right | 3.1 km || 
|-id=454 bgcolor=#d6d6d6
| 470454 ||  || — || November 1, 2007 || Kitt Peak || Spacewatch || — || align=right | 2.6 km || 
|-id=455 bgcolor=#d6d6d6
| 470455 ||  || — || November 13, 2007 || Mount Lemmon || Mount Lemmon Survey || — || align=right | 2.8 km || 
|-id=456 bgcolor=#d6d6d6
| 470456 ||  || — || December 30, 2007 || Mount Lemmon || Mount Lemmon Survey || — || align=right | 2.3 km || 
|-id=457 bgcolor=#d6d6d6
| 470457 ||  || — || December 16, 2007 || Mount Lemmon || Mount Lemmon Survey || EOS || align=right | 1.7 km || 
|-id=458 bgcolor=#d6d6d6
| 470458 ||  || — || December 16, 2007 || Mount Lemmon || Mount Lemmon Survey || — || align=right | 2.3 km || 
|-id=459 bgcolor=#d6d6d6
| 470459 ||  || — || December 31, 2007 || Mount Lemmon || Mount Lemmon Survey || — || align=right | 3.2 km || 
|-id=460 bgcolor=#d6d6d6
| 470460 ||  || — || December 19, 2007 || Kitt Peak || Spacewatch || — || align=right | 4.0 km || 
|-id=461 bgcolor=#d6d6d6
| 470461 ||  || — || December 30, 2007 || Kitt Peak || Spacewatch || — || align=right | 3.2 km || 
|-id=462 bgcolor=#fefefe
| 470462 ||  || — || January 10, 2008 || Kitt Peak || Spacewatch || — || align=right data-sort-value="0.85" | 850 m || 
|-id=463 bgcolor=#d6d6d6
| 470463 ||  || — || December 30, 2007 || Mount Lemmon || Mount Lemmon Survey || — || align=right | 4.0 km || 
|-id=464 bgcolor=#d6d6d6
| 470464 ||  || — || January 10, 2008 || Kitt Peak || Spacewatch || — || align=right | 4.0 km || 
|-id=465 bgcolor=#d6d6d6
| 470465 ||  || — || January 11, 2008 || Kitt Peak || Spacewatch || — || align=right | 2.7 km || 
|-id=466 bgcolor=#d6d6d6
| 470466 ||  || — || January 11, 2008 || Kitt Peak || Spacewatch || — || align=right | 2.6 km || 
|-id=467 bgcolor=#fefefe
| 470467 ||  || — || September 16, 2006 || Catalina || CSS || — || align=right data-sort-value="0.86" | 860 m || 
|-id=468 bgcolor=#d6d6d6
| 470468 ||  || — || January 11, 2008 || Mount Lemmon || Mount Lemmon Survey || — || align=right | 4.6 km || 
|-id=469 bgcolor=#d6d6d6
| 470469 ||  || — || January 14, 2008 || Kitt Peak || Spacewatch || — || align=right | 2.2 km || 
|-id=470 bgcolor=#d6d6d6
| 470470 ||  || — || November 11, 2007 || Mount Lemmon || Mount Lemmon Survey || — || align=right | 3.0 km || 
|-id=471 bgcolor=#d6d6d6
| 470471 ||  || — || December 31, 2007 || Mount Lemmon || Mount Lemmon Survey || 7:4 || align=right | 4.5 km || 
|-id=472 bgcolor=#fefefe
| 470472 ||  || — || December 14, 2007 || Mount Lemmon || Mount Lemmon Survey || — || align=right data-sort-value="0.66" | 660 m || 
|-id=473 bgcolor=#d6d6d6
| 470473 ||  || — || January 1, 2008 || Kitt Peak || Spacewatch || — || align=right | 2.9 km || 
|-id=474 bgcolor=#d6d6d6
| 470474 ||  || — || January 14, 2008 || Kitt Peak || Spacewatch || VER || align=right | 2.6 km || 
|-id=475 bgcolor=#d6d6d6
| 470475 ||  || — || January 15, 2008 || Mount Lemmon || Mount Lemmon Survey || — || align=right | 2.5 km || 
|-id=476 bgcolor=#d6d6d6
| 470476 ||  || — || December 30, 2007 || Mount Lemmon || Mount Lemmon Survey || — || align=right | 3.2 km || 
|-id=477 bgcolor=#d6d6d6
| 470477 ||  || — || January 11, 2008 || Kitt Peak || Spacewatch || — || align=right | 2.7 km || 
|-id=478 bgcolor=#fefefe
| 470478 ||  || — || January 13, 2008 || Kitt Peak || Spacewatch || — || align=right | 1.1 km || 
|-id=479 bgcolor=#d6d6d6
| 470479 ||  || — || January 1, 2008 || Kitt Peak || Spacewatch || — || align=right | 3.0 km || 
|-id=480 bgcolor=#d6d6d6
| 470480 ||  || — || January 11, 2008 || Socorro || LINEAR || — || align=right | 2.9 km || 
|-id=481 bgcolor=#d6d6d6
| 470481 ||  || — || January 16, 2008 || Kitt Peak || Spacewatch || — || align=right | 2.9 km || 
|-id=482 bgcolor=#d6d6d6
| 470482 ||  || — || January 16, 2008 || Kitt Peak || Spacewatch || — || align=right | 3.0 km || 
|-id=483 bgcolor=#fefefe
| 470483 ||  || — || January 19, 2008 || Mount Lemmon || Mount Lemmon Survey || — || align=right data-sort-value="0.68" | 680 m || 
|-id=484 bgcolor=#d6d6d6
| 470484 ||  || — || December 5, 2007 || Kitt Peak || Spacewatch || — || align=right | 3.0 km || 
|-id=485 bgcolor=#fefefe
| 470485 ||  || — || January 30, 2008 || Mount Lemmon || Mount Lemmon Survey || (2076) || align=right data-sort-value="0.71" | 710 m || 
|-id=486 bgcolor=#fefefe
| 470486 ||  || — || December 30, 2007 || Kitt Peak || Spacewatch || — || align=right data-sort-value="0.64" | 640 m || 
|-id=487 bgcolor=#fefefe
| 470487 ||  || — || January 14, 2008 || Kitt Peak || Spacewatch || — || align=right data-sort-value="0.79" | 790 m || 
|-id=488 bgcolor=#d6d6d6
| 470488 ||  || — || November 18, 2007 || Mount Lemmon || Mount Lemmon Survey || — || align=right | 2.7 km || 
|-id=489 bgcolor=#d6d6d6
| 470489 ||  || — || November 21, 2007 || Mount Lemmon || Mount Lemmon Survey || — || align=right | 3.2 km || 
|-id=490 bgcolor=#d6d6d6
| 470490 ||  || — || January 18, 2008 || Kitt Peak || Spacewatch || — || align=right | 2.6 km || 
|-id=491 bgcolor=#d6d6d6
| 470491 ||  || — || January 19, 2008 || Kitt Peak || Spacewatch || THM || align=right | 2.3 km || 
|-id=492 bgcolor=#d6d6d6
| 470492 ||  || — || January 18, 2008 || Mount Lemmon || Mount Lemmon Survey || — || align=right | 2.5 km || 
|-id=493 bgcolor=#fefefe
| 470493 ||  || — || January 19, 2008 || Mount Lemmon || Mount Lemmon Survey || — || align=right data-sort-value="0.93" | 930 m || 
|-id=494 bgcolor=#d6d6d6
| 470494 ||  || — || February 2, 2008 || Kitt Peak || Spacewatch || — || align=right | 1.9 km || 
|-id=495 bgcolor=#d6d6d6
| 470495 ||  || — || February 2, 2008 || Kitt Peak || Spacewatch || — || align=right | 3.2 km || 
|-id=496 bgcolor=#d6d6d6
| 470496 ||  || — || February 2, 2008 || Kitt Peak || Spacewatch || — || align=right | 2.4 km || 
|-id=497 bgcolor=#fefefe
| 470497 ||  || — || January 11, 2008 || Mount Lemmon || Mount Lemmon Survey || — || align=right data-sort-value="0.76" | 760 m || 
|-id=498 bgcolor=#fefefe
| 470498 ||  || — || February 7, 2008 || Kitt Peak || Spacewatch || — || align=right data-sort-value="0.65" | 650 m || 
|-id=499 bgcolor=#d6d6d6
| 470499 ||  || — || January 15, 2008 || Mount Lemmon || Mount Lemmon Survey || VER || align=right | 2.7 km || 
|-id=500 bgcolor=#d6d6d6
| 470500 ||  || — || February 7, 2008 || Mount Lemmon || Mount Lemmon Survey || — || align=right | 2.4 km || 
|}

470501–470600 

|-bgcolor=#d6d6d6
| 470501 ||  || — || February 8, 2008 || Mount Lemmon || Mount Lemmon Survey || — || align=right | 2.8 km || 
|-id=502 bgcolor=#d6d6d6
| 470502 ||  || — || January 19, 2008 || Mount Lemmon || Mount Lemmon Survey || — || align=right | 3.9 km || 
|-id=503 bgcolor=#d6d6d6
| 470503 ||  || — || January 12, 2008 || Catalina || CSS || — || align=right | 4.1 km || 
|-id=504 bgcolor=#d6d6d6
| 470504 ||  || — || February 8, 2008 || Kitt Peak || Spacewatch || EOS || align=right | 1.7 km || 
|-id=505 bgcolor=#d6d6d6
| 470505 ||  || — || January 13, 2008 || Kitt Peak || Spacewatch || Tj (2.99) || align=right | 3.9 km || 
|-id=506 bgcolor=#fefefe
| 470506 ||  || — || February 8, 2008 || Mount Lemmon || Mount Lemmon Survey || — || align=right data-sort-value="0.75" | 750 m || 
|-id=507 bgcolor=#fefefe
| 470507 ||  || — || February 8, 2008 || Mount Lemmon || Mount Lemmon Survey || ERI || align=right | 1.3 km || 
|-id=508 bgcolor=#d6d6d6
| 470508 ||  || — || December 15, 2007 || Kitt Peak || Spacewatch || — || align=right | 4.1 km || 
|-id=509 bgcolor=#fefefe
| 470509 ||  || — || February 9, 2008 || Kitt Peak || Spacewatch || — || align=right data-sort-value="0.73" | 730 m || 
|-id=510 bgcolor=#FFC2E0
| 470510 ||  || — || February 10, 2008 || Kitt Peak || Spacewatch || AMO || align=right data-sort-value="0.54" | 540 m || 
|-id=511 bgcolor=#fefefe
| 470511 ||  || — || December 4, 2007 || Kitt Peak || Spacewatch || — || align=right data-sort-value="0.74" | 740 m || 
|-id=512 bgcolor=#fefefe
| 470512 ||  || — || February 8, 2008 || Kitt Peak || Spacewatch || — || align=right data-sort-value="0.65" | 650 m || 
|-id=513 bgcolor=#d6d6d6
| 470513 ||  || — || February 8, 2008 || Kitt Peak || Spacewatch || — || align=right | 2.9 km || 
|-id=514 bgcolor=#d6d6d6
| 470514 ||  || — || February 8, 2008 || Kitt Peak || Spacewatch || — || align=right | 2.4 km || 
|-id=515 bgcolor=#d6d6d6
| 470515 ||  || — || February 8, 2008 || Kitt Peak || Spacewatch || — || align=right | 2.4 km || 
|-id=516 bgcolor=#fefefe
| 470516 ||  || — || February 8, 2008 || Kitt Peak || Spacewatch || — || align=right data-sort-value="0.62" | 620 m || 
|-id=517 bgcolor=#fefefe
| 470517 ||  || — || February 9, 2008 || Kitt Peak || Spacewatch || — || align=right data-sort-value="0.68" | 680 m || 
|-id=518 bgcolor=#d6d6d6
| 470518 ||  || — || January 16, 2008 || Kitt Peak || Spacewatch || VER || align=right | 2.9 km || 
|-id=519 bgcolor=#d6d6d6
| 470519 ||  || — || February 2, 2008 || Kitt Peak || Spacewatch || — || align=right | 3.2 km || 
|-id=520 bgcolor=#d6d6d6
| 470520 ||  || — || November 17, 2006 || Mount Lemmon || Mount Lemmon Survey || — || align=right | 2.5 km || 
|-id=521 bgcolor=#fefefe
| 470521 ||  || — || February 9, 2008 || Kitt Peak || Spacewatch || — || align=right data-sort-value="0.71" | 710 m || 
|-id=522 bgcolor=#d6d6d6
| 470522 ||  || — || December 17, 2001 || Socorro || LINEAR || — || align=right | 3.6 km || 
|-id=523 bgcolor=#C2E0FF
| 470523 ||  || — || February 11, 2008 || Palomar || Palomar Obs. || res3:5 || align=right | 247 km || 
|-id=524 bgcolor=#fefefe
| 470524 ||  || — || February 8, 2008 || Mount Lemmon || Mount Lemmon Survey || — || align=right data-sort-value="0.65" | 650 m || 
|-id=525 bgcolor=#d6d6d6
| 470525 ||  || — || February 12, 2008 || Kitt Peak || Spacewatch || — || align=right | 3.1 km || 
|-id=526 bgcolor=#E9E9E9
| 470526 ||  || — || February 2, 2008 || Kitt Peak || Spacewatch || — || align=right | 2.3 km || 
|-id=527 bgcolor=#d6d6d6
| 470527 ||  || — || February 2, 2008 || Kitt Peak || Spacewatch || — || align=right | 2.9 km || 
|-id=528 bgcolor=#fefefe
| 470528 ||  || — || February 8, 2008 || Mount Lemmon || Mount Lemmon Survey || — || align=right data-sort-value="0.75" | 750 m || 
|-id=529 bgcolor=#fefefe
| 470529 ||  || — || February 13, 2008 || Mount Lemmon || Mount Lemmon Survey || MAS || align=right data-sort-value="0.71" | 710 m || 
|-id=530 bgcolor=#d6d6d6
| 470530 ||  || — || February 24, 2008 || Kitt Peak || Spacewatch || — || align=right | 3.9 km || 
|-id=531 bgcolor=#d6d6d6
| 470531 ||  || — || January 11, 2008 || Kitt Peak || Spacewatch || — || align=right | 2.5 km || 
|-id=532 bgcolor=#d6d6d6
| 470532 ||  || — || February 3, 2008 || Catalina || CSS || — || align=right | 3.6 km || 
|-id=533 bgcolor=#FA8072
| 470533 ||  || — || January 11, 2008 || Catalina || CSS || — || align=right data-sort-value="0.51" | 510 m || 
|-id=534 bgcolor=#d6d6d6
| 470534 ||  || — || January 14, 2008 || Kitt Peak || Spacewatch || Tj (2.99) || align=right | 3.1 km || 
|-id=535 bgcolor=#d6d6d6
| 470535 ||  || — || February 27, 2008 || Kitt Peak || Spacewatch || — || align=right | 4.6 km || 
|-id=536 bgcolor=#fefefe
| 470536 ||  || — || February 27, 2008 || Kitt Peak || Spacewatch || — || align=right data-sort-value="0.87" | 870 m || 
|-id=537 bgcolor=#fefefe
| 470537 ||  || — || February 27, 2008 || Mount Lemmon || Mount Lemmon Survey || — || align=right data-sort-value="0.94" | 940 m || 
|-id=538 bgcolor=#d6d6d6
| 470538 ||  || — || February 10, 2008 || Catalina || CSS || — || align=right | 3.6 km || 
|-id=539 bgcolor=#d6d6d6
| 470539 ||  || — || February 27, 2008 || Catalina || CSS || — || align=right | 4.4 km || 
|-id=540 bgcolor=#d6d6d6
| 470540 ||  || — || February 26, 2008 || Kitt Peak || Spacewatch || URS || align=right | 5.2 km || 
|-id=541 bgcolor=#fefefe
| 470541 ||  || — || November 24, 2003 || Kitt Peak || Spacewatch || — || align=right data-sort-value="0.83" | 830 m || 
|-id=542 bgcolor=#fefefe
| 470542 ||  || — || March 1, 2008 || Kitt Peak || Spacewatch || MAS || align=right data-sort-value="0.75" | 750 m || 
|-id=543 bgcolor=#fefefe
| 470543 ||  || — || March 4, 2008 || Kitt Peak || Spacewatch || — || align=right data-sort-value="0.88" | 880 m || 
|-id=544 bgcolor=#d6d6d6
| 470544 ||  || — || February 9, 2008 || Mount Lemmon || Mount Lemmon Survey || — || align=right | 3.0 km || 
|-id=545 bgcolor=#d6d6d6
| 470545 ||  || — || November 19, 2006 || Catalina || CSS || — || align=right | 2.9 km || 
|-id=546 bgcolor=#fefefe
| 470546 ||  || — || March 7, 2008 || Kitt Peak || Spacewatch || ERI || align=right | 1.3 km || 
|-id=547 bgcolor=#fefefe
| 470547 ||  || — || March 10, 2008 || Nyukasa || Mount Nyukasa Stn. || — || align=right data-sort-value="0.57" | 570 m || 
|-id=548 bgcolor=#fefefe
| 470548 ||  || — || December 20, 2007 || Mount Lemmon || Mount Lemmon Survey || — || align=right | 1.3 km || 
|-id=549 bgcolor=#fefefe
| 470549 ||  || — || February 13, 2008 || Kitt Peak || Spacewatch || — || align=right data-sort-value="0.65" | 650 m || 
|-id=550 bgcolor=#d6d6d6
| 470550 ||  || — || March 7, 2008 || Mount Lemmon || Mount Lemmon Survey || — || align=right | 4.7 km || 
|-id=551 bgcolor=#fefefe
| 470551 ||  || — || February 26, 2008 || Mount Lemmon || Mount Lemmon Survey || NYS || align=right data-sort-value="0.56" | 560 m || 
|-id=552 bgcolor=#fefefe
| 470552 ||  || — || March 1, 2008 || Kitt Peak || Spacewatch || — || align=right data-sort-value="0.67" | 670 m || 
|-id=553 bgcolor=#d6d6d6
| 470553 ||  || — || March 1, 2008 || Kitt Peak || Spacewatch || — || align=right | 1.9 km || 
|-id=554 bgcolor=#d6d6d6
| 470554 ||  || — || March 25, 2008 || Kitt Peak || Spacewatch || — || align=right | 3.2 km || 
|-id=555 bgcolor=#d6d6d6
| 470555 ||  || — || February 8, 2008 || Kitt Peak || Spacewatch || VER || align=right | 2.5 km || 
|-id=556 bgcolor=#d6d6d6
| 470556 ||  || — || February 8, 2008 || Kitt Peak || Spacewatch || — || align=right | 2.8 km || 
|-id=557 bgcolor=#fefefe
| 470557 ||  || — || March 10, 2008 || Mount Lemmon || Mount Lemmon Survey || — || align=right data-sort-value="0.78" | 780 m || 
|-id=558 bgcolor=#fefefe
| 470558 ||  || — || March 28, 2008 || Mount Lemmon || Mount Lemmon Survey || — || align=right data-sort-value="0.72" | 720 m || 
|-id=559 bgcolor=#fefefe
| 470559 ||  || — || March 28, 2008 || Mount Lemmon || Mount Lemmon Survey || — || align=right data-sort-value="0.75" | 750 m || 
|-id=560 bgcolor=#fefefe
| 470560 ||  || — || March 28, 2008 || Kitt Peak || Spacewatch || — || align=right data-sort-value="0.68" | 680 m || 
|-id=561 bgcolor=#d6d6d6
| 470561 ||  || — || March 31, 2008 || Kitt Peak || Spacewatch || — || align=right | 4.2 km || 
|-id=562 bgcolor=#fefefe
| 470562 ||  || — || March 10, 2008 || Kitt Peak || Spacewatch || — || align=right data-sort-value="0.70" | 700 m || 
|-id=563 bgcolor=#fefefe
| 470563 ||  || — || March 30, 2008 || Kitt Peak || Spacewatch || — || align=right data-sort-value="0.86" | 860 m || 
|-id=564 bgcolor=#fefefe
| 470564 ||  || — || March 5, 2008 || Mount Lemmon || Mount Lemmon Survey || MAS || align=right data-sort-value="0.62" | 620 m || 
|-id=565 bgcolor=#fefefe
| 470565 ||  || — || April 3, 2008 || Kitt Peak || Spacewatch || — || align=right data-sort-value="0.78" | 780 m || 
|-id=566 bgcolor=#fefefe
| 470566 ||  || — || April 5, 2008 || Mount Lemmon || Mount Lemmon Survey || — || align=right data-sort-value="0.81" | 810 m || 
|-id=567 bgcolor=#fefefe
| 470567 ||  || — || April 6, 2008 || Kitt Peak || Spacewatch || — || align=right data-sort-value="0.67" | 670 m || 
|-id=568 bgcolor=#d6d6d6
| 470568 ||  || — || April 8, 2008 || Kitt Peak || Spacewatch || — || align=right | 2.6 km || 
|-id=569 bgcolor=#fefefe
| 470569 ||  || — || March 4, 2008 || Kitt Peak || Spacewatch || — || align=right data-sort-value="0.64" | 640 m || 
|-id=570 bgcolor=#fefefe
| 470570 ||  || — || April 11, 2008 || Kitt Peak || Spacewatch || — || align=right data-sort-value="0.78" | 780 m || 
|-id=571 bgcolor=#fefefe
| 470571 ||  || — || March 30, 2008 || Catalina || CSS || — || align=right data-sort-value="0.89" | 890 m || 
|-id=572 bgcolor=#fefefe
| 470572 ||  || — || March 6, 2008 || Catalina || CSS || H || align=right data-sort-value="0.71" | 710 m || 
|-id=573 bgcolor=#fefefe
| 470573 ||  || — || April 6, 2008 || Kitt Peak || Spacewatch || V || align=right data-sort-value="0.74" | 740 m || 
|-id=574 bgcolor=#fefefe
| 470574 ||  || — || April 14, 2008 || Mount Lemmon || Mount Lemmon Survey || — || align=right data-sort-value="0.90" | 900 m || 
|-id=575 bgcolor=#fefefe
| 470575 ||  || — || April 15, 2008 || Kitt Peak || Spacewatch || — || align=right | 1.1 km || 
|-id=576 bgcolor=#fefefe
| 470576 ||  || — || August 30, 2005 || Kitt Peak || Spacewatch || — || align=right data-sort-value="0.80" | 800 m || 
|-id=577 bgcolor=#fefefe
| 470577 ||  || — || April 15, 2008 || Mount Lemmon || Mount Lemmon Survey || — || align=right | 1.0 km || 
|-id=578 bgcolor=#fefefe
| 470578 ||  || — || April 11, 2008 || Mount Lemmon || Mount Lemmon Survey || NYS || align=right data-sort-value="0.47" | 470 m || 
|-id=579 bgcolor=#fefefe
| 470579 ||  || — || April 29, 2008 || Kitt Peak || Spacewatch || NYS || align=right data-sort-value="0.55" | 550 m || 
|-id=580 bgcolor=#fefefe
| 470580 ||  || — || April 27, 2008 || Kitt Peak || Spacewatch || — || align=right | 1.2 km || 
|-id=581 bgcolor=#fefefe
| 470581 ||  || — || April 29, 2008 || Kitt Peak || Spacewatch || — || align=right data-sort-value="0.62" | 620 m || 
|-id=582 bgcolor=#fefefe
| 470582 ||  || — || March 12, 2008 || Mount Lemmon || Mount Lemmon Survey || V || align=right data-sort-value="0.68" | 680 m || 
|-id=583 bgcolor=#fefefe
| 470583 ||  || — || May 3, 2008 || Kitt Peak || Spacewatch || — || align=right data-sort-value="0.79" | 790 m || 
|-id=584 bgcolor=#d6d6d6
| 470584 ||  || — || February 29, 2008 || Mount Lemmon || Mount Lemmon Survey || — || align=right | 3.8 km || 
|-id=585 bgcolor=#FFC2E0
| 470585 ||  || — || May 5, 2008 || Catalina || CSS || AMOcritical || align=right data-sort-value="0.56" | 560 m || 
|-id=586 bgcolor=#fefefe
| 470586 ||  || — || April 29, 2008 || Kitt Peak || Spacewatch || — || align=right data-sort-value="0.73" | 730 m || 
|-id=587 bgcolor=#fefefe
| 470587 ||  || — || May 6, 2008 || Kitt Peak || Spacewatch || — || align=right data-sort-value="0.68" | 680 m || 
|-id=588 bgcolor=#fefefe
| 470588 ||  || — || April 14, 2008 || Mount Lemmon || Mount Lemmon Survey || — || align=right data-sort-value="0.89" | 890 m || 
|-id=589 bgcolor=#fefefe
| 470589 ||  || — || May 4, 2008 || Kitt Peak || Spacewatch || — || align=right data-sort-value="0.86" | 860 m || 
|-id=590 bgcolor=#fefefe
| 470590 ||  || — || May 27, 2008 || Kitt Peak || Spacewatch || NYS || align=right data-sort-value="0.54" | 540 m || 
|-id=591 bgcolor=#fefefe
| 470591 ||  || — || May 13, 2008 || Mount Lemmon || Mount Lemmon Survey || — || align=right data-sort-value="0.80" | 800 m || 
|-id=592 bgcolor=#fefefe
| 470592 ||  || — || May 30, 2008 || Kitt Peak || Spacewatch || — || align=right data-sort-value="0.79" | 790 m || 
|-id=593 bgcolor=#C2E0FF
| 470593 ||  || — || June 6, 2008 || Palomar || Palomar Obs. || centaurcritical || align=right | 255 km || 
|-id=594 bgcolor=#FFC2E0
| 470594 ||  || — || June 29, 2008 || Siding Spring || SSS || AMO || align=right data-sort-value="0.33" | 330 m || 
|-id=595 bgcolor=#E9E9E9
| 470595 ||  || — || July 13, 2008 || Eskridge || G. Hug || RAF || align=right data-sort-value="0.80" | 800 m || 
|-id=596 bgcolor=#C2E0FF
| 470596 ||  || — || July 7, 2008 || Palomar || Palomar Obs. || other TNO || align=right | 312 km || 
|-id=597 bgcolor=#fefefe
| 470597 ||  || — || July 28, 2008 || Mount Lemmon || Mount Lemmon Survey || H || align=right data-sort-value="0.77" | 770 m || 
|-id=598 bgcolor=#fefefe
| 470598 ||  || — || July 31, 2008 || Bergisch Gladbac || W. Bickel || — || align=right data-sort-value="0.99" | 990 m || 
|-id=599 bgcolor=#C2E0FF
| 470599 ||  || — || July 30, 2008 || Palomar || Palomar Obs. || SDO || align=right | 458 km || 
|-id=600 bgcolor=#E9E9E9
| 470600 Calogero ||  ||  || August 6, 2008 || Vicques || M. Ory || — || align=right | 1.4 km || 
|}

470601–470700 

|-bgcolor=#E9E9E9
| 470601 ||  || — || August 26, 2008 || Dauban || F. Kugel || — || align=right data-sort-value="0.98" | 980 m || 
|-id=602 bgcolor=#E9E9E9
| 470602 ||  || — || August 24, 2008 || La Cañada || J. Lacruz || critical || align=right data-sort-value="0.98" | 980 m || 
|-id=603 bgcolor=#E9E9E9
| 470603 ||  || — || August 26, 2008 || Socorro || LINEAR || — || align=right | 1.8 km || 
|-id=604 bgcolor=#E9E9E9
| 470604 ||  || — || August 23, 2008 || Kitt Peak || Spacewatch || MAR || align=right data-sort-value="0.98" | 980 m || 
|-id=605 bgcolor=#E9E9E9
| 470605 ||  || — || August 28, 2008 || La Sagra || OAM Obs. || — || align=right data-sort-value="0.74" | 740 m || 
|-id=606 bgcolor=#E9E9E9
| 470606 ||  || — || February 16, 2007 || Mount Lemmon || Mount Lemmon Survey || — || align=right | 1.6 km || 
|-id=607 bgcolor=#E9E9E9
| 470607 ||  || — || September 3, 2008 || Kitt Peak || Spacewatch || (5) || align=right data-sort-value="0.77" | 770 m || 
|-id=608 bgcolor=#fefefe
| 470608 ||  || — || September 1, 2008 || La Sagra || OAM Obs. || H || align=right data-sort-value="0.75" | 750 m || 
|-id=609 bgcolor=#E9E9E9
| 470609 ||  || — || August 22, 2004 || Kitt Peak || Spacewatch || — || align=right data-sort-value="0.77" | 770 m || 
|-id=610 bgcolor=#E9E9E9
| 470610 ||  || — || September 3, 2008 || Kitt Peak || Spacewatch || — || align=right data-sort-value="0.60" | 600 m || 
|-id=611 bgcolor=#E9E9E9
| 470611 ||  || — || September 4, 2008 || Kitt Peak || Spacewatch || — || align=right | 1.2 km || 
|-id=612 bgcolor=#E9E9E9
| 470612 ||  || — || September 2, 2008 || Kitt Peak || Spacewatch || — || align=right data-sort-value="0.75" | 750 m || 
|-id=613 bgcolor=#E9E9E9
| 470613 ||  || — || September 2, 2008 || Kitt Peak || Spacewatch || — || align=right data-sort-value="0.90" | 900 m || 
|-id=614 bgcolor=#E9E9E9
| 470614 ||  || — || September 9, 2008 || Catalina || CSS || — || align=right data-sort-value="0.95" | 950 m || 
|-id=615 bgcolor=#E9E9E9
| 470615 ||  || — || September 3, 2008 || Kitt Peak || Spacewatch || — || align=right data-sort-value="0.83" | 830 m || 
|-id=616 bgcolor=#E9E9E9
| 470616 ||  || — || September 7, 2008 || Mount Lemmon || Mount Lemmon Survey || MAR || align=right data-sort-value="0.88" | 880 m || 
|-id=617 bgcolor=#E9E9E9
| 470617 ||  || — || September 9, 2008 || Mount Lemmon || Mount Lemmon Survey || — || align=right | 1.5 km || 
|-id=618 bgcolor=#E9E9E9
| 470618 ||  || — || September 9, 2008 || Catalina || CSS || — || align=right | 1.7 km || 
|-id=619 bgcolor=#E9E9E9
| 470619 ||  || — || September 7, 2008 || Mount Lemmon || Mount Lemmon Survey || — || align=right data-sort-value="0.88" | 880 m || 
|-id=620 bgcolor=#E9E9E9
| 470620 ||  || — || September 9, 2008 || Mount Lemmon || Mount Lemmon Survey || (5) || align=right data-sort-value="0.60" | 600 m || 
|-id=621 bgcolor=#E9E9E9
| 470621 ||  || — || September 9, 2008 || Mount Lemmon || Mount Lemmon Survey || EUN || align=right | 1.2 km || 
|-id=622 bgcolor=#E9E9E9
| 470622 ||  || — || September 6, 2008 || Catalina || CSS || — || align=right | 2.2 km || 
|-id=623 bgcolor=#E9E9E9
| 470623 ||  || — || September 7, 2008 || Mount Lemmon || Mount Lemmon Survey || — || align=right | 2.7 km || 
|-id=624 bgcolor=#E9E9E9
| 470624 ||  || — || September 19, 2008 || Kitt Peak || Spacewatch || — || align=right data-sort-value="0.49" | 490 m || 
|-id=625 bgcolor=#E9E9E9
| 470625 ||  || — || September 4, 2008 || Kitt Peak || Spacewatch || — || align=right | 1.1 km || 
|-id=626 bgcolor=#E9E9E9
| 470626 ||  || — || September 5, 2008 || Kitt Peak || Spacewatch || — || align=right | 1.6 km || 
|-id=627 bgcolor=#E9E9E9
| 470627 ||  || — || September 20, 2008 || Kitt Peak || Spacewatch || — || align=right | 1.2 km || 
|-id=628 bgcolor=#E9E9E9
| 470628 ||  || — || September 20, 2008 || Kitt Peak || Spacewatch || — || align=right | 1.3 km || 
|-id=629 bgcolor=#E9E9E9
| 470629 ||  || — || September 20, 2008 || Kitt Peak || Spacewatch || — || align=right | 1.0 km || 
|-id=630 bgcolor=#E9E9E9
| 470630 ||  || — || September 20, 2008 || Kitt Peak || Spacewatch || — || align=right data-sort-value="0.62" | 620 m || 
|-id=631 bgcolor=#E9E9E9
| 470631 ||  || — || September 20, 2008 || Kitt Peak || Spacewatch || — || align=right data-sort-value="0.63" | 630 m || 
|-id=632 bgcolor=#E9E9E9
| 470632 ||  || — || September 2, 2008 || Kitt Peak || Spacewatch || — || align=right | 1.4 km || 
|-id=633 bgcolor=#E9E9E9
| 470633 ||  || — || September 20, 2008 || Mount Lemmon || Mount Lemmon Survey || (5) || align=right data-sort-value="0.67" | 670 m || 
|-id=634 bgcolor=#E9E9E9
| 470634 ||  || — || September 20, 2008 || Mount Lemmon || Mount Lemmon Survey || — || align=right data-sort-value="0.68" | 680 m || 
|-id=635 bgcolor=#E9E9E9
| 470635 ||  || — || September 22, 2008 || Kitt Peak || Spacewatch || — || align=right data-sort-value="0.98" | 980 m || 
|-id=636 bgcolor=#E9E9E9
| 470636 ||  || — || September 23, 2008 || Catalina || CSS || — || align=right data-sort-value="0.91" | 910 m || 
|-id=637 bgcolor=#E9E9E9
| 470637 ||  || — || September 9, 2008 || Catalina || CSS || — || align=right | 1.4 km || 
|-id=638 bgcolor=#E9E9E9
| 470638 ||  || — || September 20, 2008 || Kitt Peak || Spacewatch || — || align=right | 1.7 km || 
|-id=639 bgcolor=#E9E9E9
| 470639 ||  || — || September 21, 2008 || Kitt Peak || Spacewatch || — || align=right data-sort-value="0.95" | 950 m || 
|-id=640 bgcolor=#E9E9E9
| 470640 ||  || — || September 21, 2008 || Kitt Peak || Spacewatch || — || align=right | 1.9 km || 
|-id=641 bgcolor=#E9E9E9
| 470641 ||  || — || September 21, 2008 || Mount Lemmon || Mount Lemmon Survey || — || align=right data-sort-value="0.87" | 870 m || 
|-id=642 bgcolor=#E9E9E9
| 470642 ||  || — || September 21, 2008 || Mount Lemmon || Mount Lemmon Survey || — || align=right | 1.2 km || 
|-id=643 bgcolor=#E9E9E9
| 470643 ||  || — || September 22, 2008 || Mount Lemmon || Mount Lemmon Survey || (5) || align=right data-sort-value="0.70" | 700 m || 
|-id=644 bgcolor=#E9E9E9
| 470644 ||  || — || September 22, 2008 || Kitt Peak || Spacewatch || — || align=right data-sort-value="0.99" | 990 m || 
|-id=645 bgcolor=#E9E9E9
| 470645 ||  || — || September 22, 2008 || Kitt Peak || Spacewatch || — || align=right data-sort-value="0.93" | 930 m || 
|-id=646 bgcolor=#E9E9E9
| 470646 ||  || — || September 22, 2008 || Mount Lemmon || Mount Lemmon Survey || — || align=right data-sort-value="0.67" | 670 m || 
|-id=647 bgcolor=#E9E9E9
| 470647 ||  || — || September 22, 2008 || Mount Lemmon || Mount Lemmon Survey || — || align=right | 1.2 km || 
|-id=648 bgcolor=#E9E9E9
| 470648 ||  || — || September 22, 2008 || Mount Lemmon || Mount Lemmon Survey || — || align=right data-sort-value="0.97" | 970 m || 
|-id=649 bgcolor=#E9E9E9
| 470649 ||  || — || September 22, 2008 || Mount Lemmon || Mount Lemmon Survey || — || align=right | 1.2 km || 
|-id=650 bgcolor=#E9E9E9
| 470650 ||  || — || September 22, 2008 || Mount Lemmon || Mount Lemmon Survey || — || align=right | 1.3 km || 
|-id=651 bgcolor=#E9E9E9
| 470651 ||  || — || September 22, 2008 || Kitt Peak || Spacewatch || — || align=right | 1.3 km || 
|-id=652 bgcolor=#E9E9E9
| 470652 ||  || — || September 22, 2008 || Kitt Peak || Spacewatch || — || align=right | 1.4 km || 
|-id=653 bgcolor=#E9E9E9
| 470653 ||  || — || September 22, 2008 || Kitt Peak || Spacewatch || — || align=right | 1.3 km || 
|-id=654 bgcolor=#E9E9E9
| 470654 ||  || — || September 22, 2008 || Kitt Peak || Spacewatch || (5) || align=right data-sort-value="0.79" | 790 m || 
|-id=655 bgcolor=#E9E9E9
| 470655 ||  || — || July 29, 2008 || Kitt Peak || Spacewatch || — || align=right | 1.4 km || 
|-id=656 bgcolor=#E9E9E9
| 470656 ||  || — || September 24, 2008 || Mount Lemmon || Mount Lemmon Survey || — || align=right | 1.1 km || 
|-id=657 bgcolor=#E9E9E9
| 470657 ||  || — || September 29, 2008 || Dauban || F. Kugel || — || align=right data-sort-value="0.92" | 920 m || 
|-id=658 bgcolor=#E9E9E9
| 470658 ||  || — || September 9, 2008 || Mount Lemmon || Mount Lemmon Survey || — || align=right | 2.3 km || 
|-id=659 bgcolor=#E9E9E9
| 470659 ||  || — || August 24, 2008 || Kitt Peak || Spacewatch || — || align=right | 1.3 km || 
|-id=660 bgcolor=#E9E9E9
| 470660 ||  || — || September 23, 2008 || Kitt Peak || Spacewatch || — || align=right | 1.6 km || 
|-id=661 bgcolor=#E9E9E9
| 470661 ||  || — || September 22, 2008 || Mount Lemmon || Mount Lemmon Survey || — || align=right | 1.1 km || 
|-id=662 bgcolor=#E9E9E9
| 470662 ||  || — || September 23, 2008 || Kitt Peak || Spacewatch || — || align=right | 1.3 km || 
|-id=663 bgcolor=#E9E9E9
| 470663 ||  || — || September 23, 2008 || Kitt Peak || Spacewatch || — || align=right data-sort-value="0.96" | 960 m || 
|-id=664 bgcolor=#E9E9E9
| 470664 ||  || — || September 24, 2008 || Mount Lemmon || Mount Lemmon Survey || — || align=right | 1.2 km || 
|-id=665 bgcolor=#E9E9E9
| 470665 ||  || — || September 25, 2008 || Kitt Peak || Spacewatch || (5) || align=right data-sort-value="0.66" | 660 m || 
|-id=666 bgcolor=#E9E9E9
| 470666 ||  || — || September 25, 2008 || Kitt Peak || Spacewatch || — || align=right data-sort-value="0.79" | 790 m || 
|-id=667 bgcolor=#E9E9E9
| 470667 ||  || — || September 25, 2008 || Kitt Peak || Spacewatch || — || align=right | 1.3 km || 
|-id=668 bgcolor=#E9E9E9
| 470668 ||  || — || September 25, 2008 || Kitt Peak || Spacewatch || — || align=right data-sort-value="0.78" | 780 m || 
|-id=669 bgcolor=#E9E9E9
| 470669 ||  || — || September 26, 2008 || Kitt Peak || Spacewatch || — || align=right data-sort-value="0.84" | 840 m || 
|-id=670 bgcolor=#E9E9E9
| 470670 ||  || — || September 26, 2008 || Kitt Peak || Spacewatch || — || align=right | 1.1 km || 
|-id=671 bgcolor=#E9E9E9
| 470671 ||  || — || September 26, 2008 || Kitt Peak || Spacewatch || — || align=right | 1.2 km || 
|-id=672 bgcolor=#E9E9E9
| 470672 ||  || — || September 26, 2008 || Kitt Peak || Spacewatch || — || align=right | 1.8 km || 
|-id=673 bgcolor=#E9E9E9
| 470673 ||  || — || September 28, 2008 || Charleston || ARO || — || align=right | 1.1 km || 
|-id=674 bgcolor=#E9E9E9
| 470674 ||  || — || September 9, 2008 || Mount Lemmon || Mount Lemmon Survey || (5) || align=right data-sort-value="0.69" | 690 m || 
|-id=675 bgcolor=#E9E9E9
| 470675 ||  || — || September 28, 2008 || Mount Lemmon || Mount Lemmon Survey || — || align=right data-sort-value="0.89" | 890 m || 
|-id=676 bgcolor=#E9E9E9
| 470676 ||  || — || September 28, 2008 || Catalina || CSS || (5) || align=right data-sort-value="0.83" | 830 m || 
|-id=677 bgcolor=#E9E9E9
| 470677 ||  || — || September 30, 2008 || Catalina || CSS || EUN || align=right | 1.4 km || 
|-id=678 bgcolor=#FFC2E0
| 470678 ||  || — || September 26, 2008 || Kitt Peak || Spacewatch || AMO || align=right data-sort-value="0.21" | 210 m || 
|-id=679 bgcolor=#E9E9E9
| 470679 ||  || — || September 22, 2008 || Mount Lemmon || Mount Lemmon Survey || (5) || align=right data-sort-value="0.78" | 780 m || 
|-id=680 bgcolor=#E9E9E9
| 470680 ||  || — || September 23, 2008 || Kitt Peak || Spacewatch || — || align=right | 1.9 km || 
|-id=681 bgcolor=#E9E9E9
| 470681 ||  || — || September 24, 2008 || Kitt Peak || Spacewatch || — || align=right | 1.7 km || 
|-id=682 bgcolor=#E9E9E9
| 470682 ||  || — || September 24, 2008 || Kitt Peak || Spacewatch || EUN || align=right | 1.3 km || 
|-id=683 bgcolor=#E9E9E9
| 470683 ||  || — || September 24, 2008 || Kitt Peak || Spacewatch || GEF || align=right | 1.2 km || 
|-id=684 bgcolor=#E9E9E9
| 470684 ||  || — || September 22, 2008 || Kitt Peak || Spacewatch || — || align=right | 2.1 km || 
|-id=685 bgcolor=#E9E9E9
| 470685 ||  || — || September 23, 2008 || Kitt Peak || Spacewatch || MRX || align=right data-sort-value="0.94" | 940 m || 
|-id=686 bgcolor=#E9E9E9
| 470686 ||  || — || September 23, 2008 || Mount Lemmon || Mount Lemmon Survey || — || align=right data-sort-value="0.78" | 780 m || 
|-id=687 bgcolor=#d6d6d6
| 470687 ||  || — || September 28, 2008 || Mount Lemmon || Mount Lemmon Survey || — || align=right | 2.1 km || 
|-id=688 bgcolor=#E9E9E9
| 470688 ||  || — || September 22, 2008 || Catalina || CSS || — || align=right | 1.7 km || 
|-id=689 bgcolor=#E9E9E9
| 470689 ||  || — || September 22, 2008 || Mount Lemmon || Mount Lemmon Survey || (5) || align=right data-sort-value="0.75" | 750 m || 
|-id=690 bgcolor=#E9E9E9
| 470690 ||  || — || October 1, 2008 || Mount Lemmon || Mount Lemmon Survey || — || align=right data-sort-value="0.78" | 780 m || 
|-id=691 bgcolor=#FA8072
| 470691 ||  || — || October 9, 2008 || Mount Lemmon || Mount Lemmon Survey || — || align=right | 1.2 km || 
|-id=692 bgcolor=#E9E9E9
| 470692 ||  || — || September 22, 2008 || Kitt Peak || Spacewatch || — || align=right | 1.5 km || 
|-id=693 bgcolor=#E9E9E9
| 470693 ||  || — || October 1, 2008 || Mount Lemmon || Mount Lemmon Survey || — || align=right | 1.8 km || 
|-id=694 bgcolor=#E9E9E9
| 470694 ||  || — || October 1, 2008 || Kitt Peak || Spacewatch || — || align=right | 1.2 km || 
|-id=695 bgcolor=#E9E9E9
| 470695 ||  || — || September 9, 2008 || Mount Lemmon || Mount Lemmon Survey || — || align=right | 1.2 km || 
|-id=696 bgcolor=#E9E9E9
| 470696 ||  || — || October 2, 2008 || Kitt Peak || Spacewatch || — || align=right | 1.9 km || 
|-id=697 bgcolor=#E9E9E9
| 470697 ||  || — || September 22, 2008 || Mount Lemmon || Mount Lemmon Survey || — || align=right | 1.1 km || 
|-id=698 bgcolor=#E9E9E9
| 470698 ||  || — || November 19, 2004 || Anderson Mesa || LONEOS || — || align=right | 1.1 km || 
|-id=699 bgcolor=#E9E9E9
| 470699 ||  || — || October 2, 2008 || Kitt Peak || Spacewatch || GEF || align=right | 1.2 km || 
|-id=700 bgcolor=#E9E9E9
| 470700 ||  || — || October 2, 2008 || Catalina || CSS || — || align=right data-sort-value="0.90" | 900 m || 
|}

470701–470800 

|-bgcolor=#E9E9E9
| 470701 ||  || — || September 22, 2008 || Kitt Peak || Spacewatch || — || align=right | 1.1 km || 
|-id=702 bgcolor=#E9E9E9
| 470702 ||  || — || October 2, 2008 || Kitt Peak || Spacewatch || — || align=right | 1.3 km || 
|-id=703 bgcolor=#fefefe
| 470703 ||  || — || September 21, 2008 || Mount Lemmon || Mount Lemmon Survey || H || align=right data-sort-value="0.93" | 930 m || 
|-id=704 bgcolor=#E9E9E9
| 470704 ||  || — || October 6, 2008 || Catalina || CSS || — || align=right data-sort-value="0.87" | 870 m || 
|-id=705 bgcolor=#d6d6d6
| 470705 ||  || — || September 23, 2008 || Kitt Peak || Spacewatch || — || align=right | 2.1 km || 
|-id=706 bgcolor=#E9E9E9
| 470706 ||  || — || October 8, 2008 || Kitt Peak || Spacewatch || — || align=right | 2.3 km || 
|-id=707 bgcolor=#E9E9E9
| 470707 ||  || — || September 23, 2008 || Kitt Peak || Spacewatch || EUN || align=right | 1.2 km || 
|-id=708 bgcolor=#E9E9E9
| 470708 ||  || — || September 22, 2008 || Kitt Peak || Spacewatch || AGN || align=right | 1.2 km || 
|-id=709 bgcolor=#E9E9E9
| 470709 ||  || — || October 2, 2008 || Kitt Peak || Spacewatch || — || align=right | 1.2 km || 
|-id=710 bgcolor=#E9E9E9
| 470710 ||  || — || October 9, 2008 || Catalina || CSS || — || align=right | 1.4 km || 
|-id=711 bgcolor=#E9E9E9
| 470711 ||  || — || October 2, 2008 || Mount Lemmon || Mount Lemmon Survey || — || align=right data-sort-value="0.75" | 750 m || 
|-id=712 bgcolor=#E9E9E9
| 470712 ||  || — || October 9, 2008 || Catalina || CSS || — || align=right | 1.2 km || 
|-id=713 bgcolor=#E9E9E9
| 470713 ||  || — || October 10, 2008 || Mount Lemmon || Mount Lemmon Survey || — || align=right | 1.2 km || 
|-id=714 bgcolor=#E9E9E9
| 470714 ||  || — || October 4, 2008 || Mount Lemmon || Mount Lemmon Survey || (5) || align=right data-sort-value="0.85" | 850 m || 
|-id=715 bgcolor=#E9E9E9
| 470715 ||  || — || October 22, 2008 || Sierra Stars || F. Tozzi || — || align=right data-sort-value="0.77" | 770 m || 
|-id=716 bgcolor=#E9E9E9
| 470716 ||  || — || September 30, 2008 || Mount Lemmon || Mount Lemmon Survey || — || align=right | 1.5 km || 
|-id=717 bgcolor=#E9E9E9
| 470717 ||  || — || September 29, 2008 || Catalina || CSS || — || align=right | 1.5 km || 
|-id=718 bgcolor=#E9E9E9
| 470718 ||  || — || October 17, 2008 || Kitt Peak || Spacewatch || — || align=right data-sort-value="0.64" | 640 m || 
|-id=719 bgcolor=#E9E9E9
| 470719 ||  || — || October 18, 2008 || Kitt Peak || Spacewatch || — || align=right data-sort-value="0.81" | 810 m || 
|-id=720 bgcolor=#E9E9E9
| 470720 ||  || — || October 6, 2008 || Mount Lemmon || Mount Lemmon Survey || — || align=right | 1.5 km || 
|-id=721 bgcolor=#E9E9E9
| 470721 ||  || — || October 20, 2008 || Kitt Peak || Spacewatch || — || align=right | 1.3 km || 
|-id=722 bgcolor=#E9E9E9
| 470722 ||  || — || October 20, 2008 || Kitt Peak || Spacewatch || JUN || align=right | 1.1 km || 
|-id=723 bgcolor=#E9E9E9
| 470723 ||  || — || October 20, 2008 || Kitt Peak || Spacewatch || GEF || align=right | 1.2 km || 
|-id=724 bgcolor=#E9E9E9
| 470724 ||  || — || October 20, 2008 || Kitt Peak || Spacewatch || — || align=right | 1.4 km || 
|-id=725 bgcolor=#E9E9E9
| 470725 ||  || — || October 6, 2008 || Mount Lemmon || Mount Lemmon Survey || EUN || align=right | 1.00 km || 
|-id=726 bgcolor=#fefefe
| 470726 ||  || — || October 20, 2008 || Kitt Peak || Spacewatch || H || align=right data-sort-value="0.82" | 820 m || 
|-id=727 bgcolor=#E9E9E9
| 470727 ||  || — || October 21, 2008 || Kitt Peak || Spacewatch || — || align=right data-sort-value="0.83" | 830 m || 
|-id=728 bgcolor=#E9E9E9
| 470728 ||  || — || October 21, 2008 || Kitt Peak || Spacewatch || — || align=right | 1.5 km || 
|-id=729 bgcolor=#E9E9E9
| 470729 ||  || — || October 21, 2008 || Kitt Peak || Spacewatch || (5) || align=right data-sort-value="0.73" | 730 m || 
|-id=730 bgcolor=#E9E9E9
| 470730 ||  || — || October 21, 2008 || Kitt Peak || Spacewatch || — || align=right | 1.4 km || 
|-id=731 bgcolor=#E9E9E9
| 470731 ||  || — || October 21, 2008 || Kitt Peak || Spacewatch || — || align=right | 1.4 km || 
|-id=732 bgcolor=#E9E9E9
| 470732 ||  || — || October 21, 2008 || Kitt Peak || Spacewatch || — || align=right | 1.9 km || 
|-id=733 bgcolor=#E9E9E9
| 470733 ||  || — || September 24, 2008 || Mount Lemmon || Mount Lemmon Survey || — || align=right | 1.0 km || 
|-id=734 bgcolor=#E9E9E9
| 470734 ||  || — || September 28, 2008 || Mount Lemmon || Mount Lemmon Survey || — || align=right | 1.5 km || 
|-id=735 bgcolor=#E9E9E9
| 470735 ||  || — || October 22, 2008 || Kitt Peak || Spacewatch || (5) || align=right data-sort-value="0.70" | 700 m || 
|-id=736 bgcolor=#E9E9E9
| 470736 ||  || — || October 8, 2008 || Catalina || CSS || — || align=right | 1.4 km || 
|-id=737 bgcolor=#E9E9E9
| 470737 ||  || — || September 23, 2008 || Mount Lemmon || Mount Lemmon Survey || EUN || align=right | 1.3 km || 
|-id=738 bgcolor=#E9E9E9
| 470738 ||  || — || September 9, 2008 || Mount Lemmon || Mount Lemmon Survey || EUN || align=right | 1.2 km || 
|-id=739 bgcolor=#E9E9E9
| 470739 ||  || — || October 21, 2008 || Mount Lemmon || Mount Lemmon Survey || — || align=right | 1.4 km || 
|-id=740 bgcolor=#E9E9E9
| 470740 ||  || — || October 1, 2008 || Mount Lemmon || Mount Lemmon Survey || — || align=right | 1.8 km || 
|-id=741 bgcolor=#E9E9E9
| 470741 ||  || — || September 6, 2008 || Mount Lemmon || Mount Lemmon Survey || (5) || align=right data-sort-value="0.74" | 740 m || 
|-id=742 bgcolor=#E9E9E9
| 470742 ||  || — || October 22, 2008 || Kitt Peak || Spacewatch || — || align=right | 1.5 km || 
|-id=743 bgcolor=#E9E9E9
| 470743 ||  || — || October 22, 2008 || Kitt Peak || Spacewatch || — || align=right | 1.5 km || 
|-id=744 bgcolor=#E9E9E9
| 470744 ||  || — || September 23, 2008 || Catalina || CSS || — || align=right | 1.7 km || 
|-id=745 bgcolor=#d6d6d6
| 470745 ||  || — || September 25, 2008 || Kitt Peak || Spacewatch || — || align=right | 3.5 km || 
|-id=746 bgcolor=#E9E9E9
| 470746 ||  || — || October 22, 2008 || Kitt Peak || Spacewatch || — || align=right | 1.4 km || 
|-id=747 bgcolor=#E9E9E9
| 470747 ||  || — || September 7, 2008 || Mount Lemmon || Mount Lemmon Survey || — || align=right | 1.3 km || 
|-id=748 bgcolor=#E9E9E9
| 470748 ||  || — || October 23, 2008 || Kitt Peak || Spacewatch || — || align=right | 1.3 km || 
|-id=749 bgcolor=#E9E9E9
| 470749 ||  || — || October 23, 2008 || Kitt Peak || Spacewatch || — || align=right | 1.1 km || 
|-id=750 bgcolor=#E9E9E9
| 470750 ||  || — || October 23, 2008 || Kitt Peak || Spacewatch || — || align=right data-sort-value="0.89" | 890 m || 
|-id=751 bgcolor=#E9E9E9
| 470751 ||  || — || September 25, 2008 || Mount Lemmon || Mount Lemmon Survey || — || align=right | 2.6 km || 
|-id=752 bgcolor=#E9E9E9
| 470752 ||  || — || October 23, 2008 || Kitt Peak || Spacewatch || MIS || align=right | 2.1 km || 
|-id=753 bgcolor=#E9E9E9
| 470753 ||  || — || September 6, 2008 || Mount Lemmon || Mount Lemmon Survey || — || align=right | 1.2 km || 
|-id=754 bgcolor=#E9E9E9
| 470754 ||  || — || October 23, 2008 || Kitt Peak || Spacewatch || — || align=right data-sort-value="0.96" | 960 m || 
|-id=755 bgcolor=#E9E9E9
| 470755 ||  || — || September 23, 2008 || Kitt Peak || Spacewatch || MAR || align=right | 1.0 km || 
|-id=756 bgcolor=#E9E9E9
| 470756 ||  || — || September 24, 2008 || Mount Lemmon || Mount Lemmon Survey || — || align=right | 1.7 km || 
|-id=757 bgcolor=#E9E9E9
| 470757 ||  || — || October 9, 2008 || Kitt Peak || Spacewatch || — || align=right | 1.4 km || 
|-id=758 bgcolor=#E9E9E9
| 470758 ||  || — || October 24, 2008 || Kitt Peak || Spacewatch || — || align=right | 1.4 km || 
|-id=759 bgcolor=#E9E9E9
| 470759 ||  || — || September 6, 2008 || Mount Lemmon || Mount Lemmon Survey || — || align=right | 1.1 km || 
|-id=760 bgcolor=#E9E9E9
| 470760 ||  || — || October 24, 2008 || Kitt Peak || Spacewatch || — || align=right | 1.1 km || 
|-id=761 bgcolor=#E9E9E9
| 470761 ||  || — || September 25, 2008 || Mount Lemmon || Mount Lemmon Survey || — || align=right | 2.3 km || 
|-id=762 bgcolor=#E9E9E9
| 470762 ||  || — || September 29, 2008 || Catalina || CSS || — || align=right | 1.1 km || 
|-id=763 bgcolor=#E9E9E9
| 470763 ||  || — || October 6, 2008 || Catalina || CSS || — || align=right data-sort-value="0.98" | 980 m || 
|-id=764 bgcolor=#E9E9E9
| 470764 ||  || — || October 10, 2008 || Catalina || CSS || — || align=right | 1.9 km || 
|-id=765 bgcolor=#E9E9E9
| 470765 ||  || — || October 28, 2008 || Socorro || LINEAR || — || align=right | 1.0 km || 
|-id=766 bgcolor=#E9E9E9
| 470766 ||  || — || October 23, 2008 || Kitt Peak || Spacewatch || — || align=right | 1.2 km || 
|-id=767 bgcolor=#E9E9E9
| 470767 ||  || — || October 25, 2008 || Kitt Peak || Spacewatch || — || align=right | 1.4 km || 
|-id=768 bgcolor=#E9E9E9
| 470768 ||  || — || October 26, 2008 || Kitt Peak || Spacewatch || — || align=right | 1.4 km || 
|-id=769 bgcolor=#E9E9E9
| 470769 ||  || — || October 26, 2008 || Kitt Peak || Spacewatch || — || align=right data-sort-value="0.98" | 980 m || 
|-id=770 bgcolor=#E9E9E9
| 470770 ||  || — || October 8, 2008 || Socorro || LINEAR || — || align=right | 1.4 km || 
|-id=771 bgcolor=#E9E9E9
| 470771 ||  || — || September 9, 2008 || Catalina || CSS || — || align=right | 1.7 km || 
|-id=772 bgcolor=#fefefe
| 470772 ||  || — || September 30, 2008 || Catalina || CSS || H || align=right data-sort-value="0.57" | 570 m || 
|-id=773 bgcolor=#E9E9E9
| 470773 ||  || — || October 27, 2008 || Kitt Peak || Spacewatch || (5) || align=right data-sort-value="0.78" | 780 m || 
|-id=774 bgcolor=#E9E9E9
| 470774 ||  || — || September 27, 2008 || Mount Lemmon || Mount Lemmon Survey || EUN || align=right | 1.2 km || 
|-id=775 bgcolor=#E9E9E9
| 470775 ||  || — || September 22, 2008 || Mount Lemmon || Mount Lemmon Survey || — || align=right | 1.8 km || 
|-id=776 bgcolor=#E9E9E9
| 470776 ||  || — || September 24, 2008 || Mount Lemmon || Mount Lemmon Survey || — || align=right | 1.2 km || 
|-id=777 bgcolor=#E9E9E9
| 470777 ||  || — || October 27, 2008 || Kitt Peak || Spacewatch || — || align=right | 1.7 km || 
|-id=778 bgcolor=#E9E9E9
| 470778 ||  || — || October 27, 2008 || Mount Lemmon || Mount Lemmon Survey || — || align=right | 1.4 km || 
|-id=779 bgcolor=#E9E9E9
| 470779 ||  || — || October 28, 2008 || Kitt Peak || Spacewatch || (5) || align=right data-sort-value="0.76" | 760 m || 
|-id=780 bgcolor=#E9E9E9
| 470780 ||  || — || October 28, 2008 || Kitt Peak || Spacewatch || NEM || align=right | 2.1 km || 
|-id=781 bgcolor=#E9E9E9
| 470781 ||  || — || October 28, 2008 || Mount Lemmon || Mount Lemmon Survey || — || align=right data-sort-value="0.81" | 810 m || 
|-id=782 bgcolor=#E9E9E9
| 470782 ||  || — || October 1, 2008 || Kitt Peak || Spacewatch || — || align=right | 2.4 km || 
|-id=783 bgcolor=#E9E9E9
| 470783 ||  || — || October 28, 2008 || Kitt Peak || Spacewatch || — || align=right | 1.3 km || 
|-id=784 bgcolor=#E9E9E9
| 470784 ||  || — || October 29, 2008 || Kitt Peak || Spacewatch || — || align=right | 1.6 km || 
|-id=785 bgcolor=#E9E9E9
| 470785 ||  || — || October 21, 2008 || Kitt Peak || Spacewatch || — || align=right | 1.2 km || 
|-id=786 bgcolor=#E9E9E9
| 470786 ||  || — || October 21, 2008 || Kitt Peak || Spacewatch || (5) || align=right data-sort-value="0.80" | 800 m || 
|-id=787 bgcolor=#E9E9E9
| 470787 ||  || — || October 21, 2008 || Kitt Peak || Spacewatch || — || align=right | 1.3 km || 
|-id=788 bgcolor=#fefefe
| 470788 ||  || — || October 30, 2008 || Catalina || CSS || H || align=right data-sort-value="0.77" | 770 m || 
|-id=789 bgcolor=#E9E9E9
| 470789 ||  || — || September 24, 2008 || Mount Lemmon || Mount Lemmon Survey || MIS || align=right | 2.7 km || 
|-id=790 bgcolor=#E9E9E9
| 470790 ||  || — || October 31, 2008 || Mount Lemmon || Mount Lemmon Survey || JUN || align=right | 1.0 km || 
|-id=791 bgcolor=#E9E9E9
| 470791 ||  || — || October 31, 2008 || Kitt Peak || Spacewatch || JUN || align=right data-sort-value="0.97" | 970 m || 
|-id=792 bgcolor=#E9E9E9
| 470792 ||  || — || October 21, 2008 || Kitt Peak || Spacewatch || — || align=right | 1.9 km || 
|-id=793 bgcolor=#E9E9E9
| 470793 ||  || — || October 22, 2008 || Kitt Peak || Spacewatch || — || align=right | 2.3 km || 
|-id=794 bgcolor=#E9E9E9
| 470794 ||  || — || October 23, 2008 || Kitt Peak || Spacewatch || — || align=right | 2.5 km || 
|-id=795 bgcolor=#E9E9E9
| 470795 ||  || — || October 28, 2008 || Kitt Peak || Spacewatch || — || align=right | 1.3 km || 
|-id=796 bgcolor=#E9E9E9
| 470796 ||  || — || October 24, 2008 || Catalina || CSS || RAF || align=right | 1.1 km || 
|-id=797 bgcolor=#E9E9E9
| 470797 ||  || — || October 28, 2008 || Kitt Peak || Spacewatch || — || align=right | 2.2 km || 
|-id=798 bgcolor=#E9E9E9
| 470798 ||  || — || September 25, 2008 || Mount Lemmon || Mount Lemmon Survey || EUN || align=right | 1.2 km || 
|-id=799 bgcolor=#E9E9E9
| 470799 ||  || — || October 28, 2008 || Kitt Peak || Spacewatch || — || align=right | 1.4 km || 
|-id=800 bgcolor=#E9E9E9
| 470800 ||  || — || October 31, 2008 || Catalina || CSS || — || align=right | 2.2 km || 
|}

470801–470900 

|-bgcolor=#E9E9E9
| 470801 ||  || — || September 5, 2008 || Socorro || LINEAR || — || align=right | 3.8 km || 
|-id=802 bgcolor=#E9E9E9
| 470802 ||  || — || September 6, 2008 || Mount Lemmon || Mount Lemmon Survey || — || align=right | 1.6 km || 
|-id=803 bgcolor=#E9E9E9
| 470803 ||  || — || November 2, 2008 || Socorro || LINEAR || — || align=right | 1.4 km || 
|-id=804 bgcolor=#E9E9E9
| 470804 ||  || — || October 20, 2008 || Kitt Peak || Spacewatch || EUN || align=right | 1.6 km || 
|-id=805 bgcolor=#E9E9E9
| 470805 ||  || — || July 29, 2008 || Mount Lemmon || Mount Lemmon Survey || — || align=right | 1.6 km || 
|-id=806 bgcolor=#E9E9E9
| 470806 ||  || — || October 25, 2008 || Kitt Peak || Spacewatch || — || align=right | 1.9 km || 
|-id=807 bgcolor=#fefefe
| 470807 ||  || — || November 6, 2008 || Socorro || LINEAR || H || align=right data-sort-value="0.67" | 670 m || 
|-id=808 bgcolor=#E9E9E9
| 470808 ||  || — || July 29, 2008 || Mount Lemmon || Mount Lemmon Survey || — || align=right | 2.0 km || 
|-id=809 bgcolor=#E9E9E9
| 470809 ||  || — || October 1, 2008 || Mount Lemmon || Mount Lemmon Survey || — || align=right | 1.9 km || 
|-id=810 bgcolor=#E9E9E9
| 470810 ||  || — || October 6, 2008 || Mount Lemmon || Mount Lemmon Survey || — || align=right | 1.6 km || 
|-id=811 bgcolor=#fefefe
| 470811 ||  || — || September 25, 2008 || Mount Lemmon || Mount Lemmon Survey || H || align=right data-sort-value="0.61" | 610 m || 
|-id=812 bgcolor=#E9E9E9
| 470812 ||  || — || November 3, 2008 || Mount Lemmon || Mount Lemmon Survey || — || align=right | 1.6 km || 
|-id=813 bgcolor=#E9E9E9
| 470813 ||  || — || November 4, 2008 || Kitt Peak || Spacewatch || — || align=right data-sort-value="0.91" | 910 m || 
|-id=814 bgcolor=#E9E9E9
| 470814 ||  || — || November 2, 2008 || Mount Lemmon || Mount Lemmon Survey || (5) || align=right data-sort-value="0.87" | 870 m || 
|-id=815 bgcolor=#E9E9E9
| 470815 ||  || — || November 7, 2008 || Mount Lemmon || Mount Lemmon Survey || — || align=right | 1.7 km || 
|-id=816 bgcolor=#d6d6d6
| 470816 ||  || — || November 2, 2008 || Mount Lemmon || Mount Lemmon Survey || — || align=right | 2.7 km || 
|-id=817 bgcolor=#E9E9E9
| 470817 ||  || — || October 27, 2008 || Kitt Peak || Spacewatch || — || align=right | 1.1 km || 
|-id=818 bgcolor=#E9E9E9
| 470818 ||  || — || November 18, 2008 || Bisei SG Center || BATTeRS || — || align=right | 1.3 km || 
|-id=819 bgcolor=#E9E9E9
| 470819 ||  || — || November 18, 2008 || Catalina || CSS || MIS || align=right | 2.1 km || 
|-id=820 bgcolor=#E9E9E9
| 470820 ||  || — || October 23, 2008 || Kitt Peak || Spacewatch || — || align=right | 1.2 km || 
|-id=821 bgcolor=#E9E9E9
| 470821 ||  || — || November 17, 2008 || Kitt Peak || Spacewatch || — || align=right | 2.1 km || 
|-id=822 bgcolor=#E9E9E9
| 470822 ||  || — || October 3, 2008 || Mount Lemmon || Mount Lemmon Survey || (1547) || align=right | 1.5 km || 
|-id=823 bgcolor=#E9E9E9
| 470823 ||  || — || November 1, 2008 || Mount Lemmon || Mount Lemmon Survey || — || align=right | 1.2 km || 
|-id=824 bgcolor=#E9E9E9
| 470824 ||  || — || October 3, 2008 || Mount Lemmon || Mount Lemmon Survey || — || align=right data-sort-value="0.89" | 890 m || 
|-id=825 bgcolor=#E9E9E9
| 470825 ||  || — || September 24, 2008 || Mount Lemmon || Mount Lemmon Survey || — || align=right | 1.3 km || 
|-id=826 bgcolor=#E9E9E9
| 470826 ||  || — || November 6, 2008 || Mount Lemmon || Mount Lemmon Survey || — || align=right | 3.1 km || 
|-id=827 bgcolor=#d6d6d6
| 470827 ||  || — || November 18, 2008 || Kitt Peak || Spacewatch || — || align=right | 3.3 km || 
|-id=828 bgcolor=#E9E9E9
| 470828 ||  || — || November 18, 2008 || Kitt Peak || Spacewatch || — || align=right | 2.2 km || 
|-id=829 bgcolor=#E9E9E9
| 470829 ||  || — || September 29, 2008 || Kitt Peak || Spacewatch || — || align=right | 1.5 km || 
|-id=830 bgcolor=#E9E9E9
| 470830 ||  || — || November 7, 2008 || Mount Lemmon || Mount Lemmon Survey || — || align=right | 2.3 km || 
|-id=831 bgcolor=#E9E9E9
| 470831 ||  || — || November 1, 2008 || Mount Lemmon || Mount Lemmon Survey || — || align=right | 1.4 km || 
|-id=832 bgcolor=#E9E9E9
| 470832 ||  || — || November 24, 2008 || Kitt Peak || Spacewatch || — || align=right | 2.1 km || 
|-id=833 bgcolor=#E9E9E9
| 470833 ||  || — || September 25, 2008 || Mount Lemmon || Mount Lemmon Survey || — || align=right data-sort-value="0.93" | 930 m || 
|-id=834 bgcolor=#E9E9E9
| 470834 ||  || — || November 17, 2008 || Kitt Peak || Spacewatch || — || align=right | 1.3 km || 
|-id=835 bgcolor=#E9E9E9
| 470835 ||  || — || November 30, 2008 || Kitt Peak || Spacewatch || — || align=right | 1.3 km || 
|-id=836 bgcolor=#E9E9E9
| 470836 ||  || — || November 18, 2008 || Kitt Peak || Spacewatch || — || align=right | 1.3 km || 
|-id=837 bgcolor=#E9E9E9
| 470837 ||  || — || November 19, 2008 || Kitt Peak || Spacewatch || ADE || align=right | 2.0 km || 
|-id=838 bgcolor=#E9E9E9
| 470838 ||  || — || November 24, 2008 || Kitt Peak || Spacewatch || MAR || align=right | 1.5 km || 
|-id=839 bgcolor=#E9E9E9
| 470839 ||  || — || December 4, 2008 || Socorro || LINEAR || — || align=right | 2.1 km || 
|-id=840 bgcolor=#E9E9E9
| 470840 ||  || — || November 7, 2008 || Mount Lemmon || Mount Lemmon Survey || — || align=right | 1.7 km || 
|-id=841 bgcolor=#E9E9E9
| 470841 ||  || — || November 2, 2008 || Kitt Peak || Spacewatch || — || align=right | 1.1 km || 
|-id=842 bgcolor=#E9E9E9
| 470842 ||  || — || November 23, 2008 || Kitt Peak || Spacewatch || — || align=right | 2.2 km || 
|-id=843 bgcolor=#E9E9E9
| 470843 ||  || — || December 2, 2008 || Kitt Peak || Spacewatch || — || align=right | 1.9 km || 
|-id=844 bgcolor=#E9E9E9
| 470844 ||  || — || December 4, 2008 || Catalina || CSS || — || align=right | 1.6 km || 
|-id=845 bgcolor=#E9E9E9
| 470845 ||  || — || December 1, 2008 || Socorro || LINEAR || — || align=right | 4.3 km || 
|-id=846 bgcolor=#E9E9E9
| 470846 ||  || — || December 6, 2008 || Socorro || LINEAR || — || align=right data-sort-value="0.85" | 850 m || 
|-id=847 bgcolor=#d6d6d6
| 470847 ||  || — || November 8, 2008 || Mount Lemmon || Mount Lemmon Survey || EOS || align=right | 2.4 km || 
|-id=848 bgcolor=#E9E9E9
| 470848 ||  || — || November 20, 2008 || Kitt Peak || Spacewatch || — || align=right | 2.6 km || 
|-id=849 bgcolor=#d6d6d6
| 470849 ||  || — || December 21, 2008 || Kitt Peak || Spacewatch || — || align=right | 2.9 km || 
|-id=850 bgcolor=#E9E9E9
| 470850 ||  || — || December 4, 2008 || Mount Lemmon || Mount Lemmon Survey || — || align=right | 2.4 km || 
|-id=851 bgcolor=#E9E9E9
| 470851 ||  || — || December 6, 2008 || Kitt Peak || Spacewatch || — || align=right | 3.0 km || 
|-id=852 bgcolor=#d6d6d6
| 470852 ||  || — || November 20, 2008 || Mount Lemmon || Mount Lemmon Survey || — || align=right | 3.3 km || 
|-id=853 bgcolor=#E9E9E9
| 470853 ||  || — || September 5, 2007 || Catalina || CSS || EUN || align=right | 1.3 km || 
|-id=854 bgcolor=#d6d6d6
| 470854 ||  || — || December 29, 2008 || Mount Lemmon || Mount Lemmon Survey || — || align=right | 3.2 km || 
|-id=855 bgcolor=#E9E9E9
| 470855 ||  || — || December 29, 2008 || Mount Lemmon || Mount Lemmon Survey || — || align=right | 2.2 km || 
|-id=856 bgcolor=#E9E9E9
| 470856 ||  || — || December 29, 2008 || Mount Lemmon || Mount Lemmon Survey || — || align=right | 1.4 km || 
|-id=857 bgcolor=#E9E9E9
| 470857 ||  || — || December 30, 2008 || Kitt Peak || Spacewatch || — || align=right | 1.5 km || 
|-id=858 bgcolor=#E9E9E9
| 470858 ||  || — || December 29, 2008 || Mount Lemmon || Mount Lemmon Survey || — || align=right data-sort-value="0.88" | 880 m || 
|-id=859 bgcolor=#E9E9E9
| 470859 ||  || — || December 29, 2008 || Kitt Peak || Spacewatch || — || align=right | 4.8 km || 
|-id=860 bgcolor=#E9E9E9
| 470860 ||  || — || December 29, 2008 || Kitt Peak || Spacewatch || — || align=right | 1.8 km || 
|-id=861 bgcolor=#d6d6d6
| 470861 ||  || — || December 29, 2008 || Kitt Peak || Spacewatch || — || align=right | 2.1 km || 
|-id=862 bgcolor=#d6d6d6
| 470862 ||  || — || December 30, 2008 || Kitt Peak || Spacewatch || — || align=right | 2.4 km || 
|-id=863 bgcolor=#d6d6d6
| 470863 ||  || — || December 30, 2008 || Kitt Peak || Spacewatch || — || align=right | 2.7 km || 
|-id=864 bgcolor=#FFC2E0
| 470864 ||  || — || December 21, 2008 || Mount Lemmon || Mount Lemmon Survey || AMO || align=right data-sort-value="0.27" | 270 m || 
|-id=865 bgcolor=#E9E9E9
| 470865 ||  || — || December 29, 2008 || Mount Lemmon || Mount Lemmon Survey || — || align=right | 1.4 km || 
|-id=866 bgcolor=#E9E9E9
| 470866 ||  || — || December 31, 2008 || Mount Lemmon || Mount Lemmon Survey ||  || align=right | 2.1 km || 
|-id=867 bgcolor=#d6d6d6
| 470867 ||  || — || December 30, 2008 || Mount Lemmon || Mount Lemmon Survey || Tj (2.96) || align=right | 3.0 km || 
|-id=868 bgcolor=#E9E9E9
| 470868 ||  || — || December 21, 2008 || Socorro || LINEAR || — || align=right | 1.5 km || 
|-id=869 bgcolor=#E9E9E9
| 470869 ||  || — || December 22, 2008 || Kitt Peak || Spacewatch || — || align=right | 1.9 km || 
|-id=870 bgcolor=#E9E9E9
| 470870 ||  || — || January 3, 2009 || Kitt Peak || Spacewatch || — || align=right | 1.4 km || 
|-id=871 bgcolor=#d6d6d6
| 470871 ||  || — || January 2, 2009 || Kitt Peak || Spacewatch || — || align=right | 3.7 km || 
|-id=872 bgcolor=#d6d6d6
| 470872 ||  || — || December 29, 2008 || Mount Lemmon || Mount Lemmon Survey || THB || align=right | 2.4 km || 
|-id=873 bgcolor=#d6d6d6
| 470873 ||  || — || January 2, 2009 || Kitt Peak || Spacewatch || — || align=right | 2.1 km || 
|-id=874 bgcolor=#d6d6d6
| 470874 ||  || — || January 3, 2009 || Mount Lemmon || Mount Lemmon Survey || — || align=right | 2.4 km || 
|-id=875 bgcolor=#E9E9E9
| 470875 ||  || — || September 28, 2008 || Kitt Peak || Spacewatch || JUN || align=right | 1.3 km || 
|-id=876 bgcolor=#E9E9E9
| 470876 ||  || — || October 10, 1993 || Kitt Peak || Spacewatch || AGN || align=right data-sort-value="0.95" | 950 m || 
|-id=877 bgcolor=#E9E9E9
| 470877 ||  || — || December 29, 2008 || Kitt Peak || Spacewatch || — || align=right | 1.9 km || 
|-id=878 bgcolor=#d6d6d6
| 470878 ||  || — || January 3, 2009 || Kitt Peak || Spacewatch || — || align=right | 2.9 km || 
|-id=879 bgcolor=#d6d6d6
| 470879 ||  || — || December 30, 2008 || Mount Lemmon || Mount Lemmon Survey || — || align=right | 3.3 km || 
|-id=880 bgcolor=#d6d6d6
| 470880 ||  || — || January 16, 2009 || Kitt Peak || Spacewatch || — || align=right | 2.4 km || 
|-id=881 bgcolor=#d6d6d6
| 470881 ||  || — || January 16, 2009 || Kitt Peak || Spacewatch || EOS || align=right | 1.6 km || 
|-id=882 bgcolor=#d6d6d6
| 470882 ||  || — || January 16, 2009 || Kitt Peak || Spacewatch || — || align=right | 3.0 km || 
|-id=883 bgcolor=#E9E9E9
| 470883 ||  || — || December 22, 2008 || Mount Lemmon || Mount Lemmon Survey || — || align=right | 2.5 km || 
|-id=884 bgcolor=#d6d6d6
| 470884 ||  || — || January 1, 2009 || Mount Lemmon || Mount Lemmon Survey || — || align=right | 2.4 km || 
|-id=885 bgcolor=#d6d6d6
| 470885 ||  || — || December 22, 2008 || Mount Lemmon || Mount Lemmon Survey || — || align=right | 3.1 km || 
|-id=886 bgcolor=#E9E9E9
| 470886 ||  || — || January 25, 2009 || Kitt Peak || Spacewatch || — || align=right | 1.7 km || 
|-id=887 bgcolor=#d6d6d6
| 470887 ||  || — || December 30, 2008 || Mount Lemmon || Mount Lemmon Survey || — || align=right | 2.5 km || 
|-id=888 bgcolor=#d6d6d6
| 470888 ||  || — || January 20, 2009 || Mount Lemmon || Mount Lemmon Survey || — || align=right | 3.2 km || 
|-id=889 bgcolor=#d6d6d6
| 470889 ||  || — || January 15, 2009 || Kitt Peak || Spacewatch || — || align=right | 2.1 km || 
|-id=890 bgcolor=#d6d6d6
| 470890 ||  || — || January 30, 2009 || Kitt Peak || Spacewatch || NAE || align=right | 2.8 km || 
|-id=891 bgcolor=#d6d6d6
| 470891 ||  || — || January 31, 2009 || Kitt Peak || Spacewatch || — || align=right | 2.3 km || 
|-id=892 bgcolor=#d6d6d6
| 470892 ||  || — || January 20, 2009 || Kitt Peak || Spacewatch || — || align=right | 2.7 km || 
|-id=893 bgcolor=#E9E9E9
| 470893 ||  || — || January 29, 2009 || Mount Lemmon || Mount Lemmon Survey || — || align=right | 1.7 km || 
|-id=894 bgcolor=#d6d6d6
| 470894 ||  || — || January 31, 2009 || Mount Lemmon || Mount Lemmon Survey || — || align=right | 3.2 km || 
|-id=895 bgcolor=#E9E9E9
| 470895 ||  || — || January 18, 2009 || Catalina || CSS || — || align=right | 1.8 km || 
|-id=896 bgcolor=#d6d6d6
| 470896 ||  || — || April 9, 1999 || Kitt Peak || Spacewatch || — || align=right | 2.2 km || 
|-id=897 bgcolor=#E9E9E9
| 470897 ||  || — || February 1, 2009 || Mount Lemmon || Mount Lemmon Survey || — || align=right | 1.6 km || 
|-id=898 bgcolor=#E9E9E9
| 470898 ||  || — || February 1, 2009 || Kitt Peak || Spacewatch || — || align=right | 1.9 km || 
|-id=899 bgcolor=#d6d6d6
| 470899 ||  || — || January 2, 2009 || Kitt Peak || Spacewatch || — || align=right | 2.8 km || 
|-id=900 bgcolor=#d6d6d6
| 470900 ||  || — || January 1, 2009 || Kitt Peak || Spacewatch || EOS || align=right | 1.9 km || 
|}

470901–471000 

|-bgcolor=#E9E9E9
| 470901 ||  || — || February 14, 2009 || Kitt Peak || Spacewatch || — || align=right | 1.9 km || 
|-id=902 bgcolor=#E9E9E9
| 470902 ||  || — || September 14, 2007 || Kitt Peak || Spacewatch || HOF || align=right | 2.3 km || 
|-id=903 bgcolor=#d6d6d6
| 470903 ||  || — || February 14, 2009 || Mount Lemmon || Mount Lemmon Survey || — || align=right | 4.0 km || 
|-id=904 bgcolor=#d6d6d6
| 470904 ||  || — || February 14, 2009 || Mount Lemmon || Mount Lemmon Survey || — || align=right | 2.4 km || 
|-id=905 bgcolor=#d6d6d6
| 470905 ||  || — || February 3, 2009 || Kitt Peak || Spacewatch || — || align=right | 2.1 km || 
|-id=906 bgcolor=#d6d6d6
| 470906 ||  || — || February 4, 2009 || Mount Lemmon || Mount Lemmon Survey || — || align=right | 2.5 km || 
|-id=907 bgcolor=#d6d6d6
| 470907 ||  || — || February 5, 2009 || Kitt Peak || Spacewatch || — || align=right | 2.5 km || 
|-id=908 bgcolor=#d6d6d6
| 470908 ||  || — || November 11, 2007 || Mount Lemmon || Mount Lemmon Survey || KOR || align=right | 1.2 km || 
|-id=909 bgcolor=#FFC2E0
| 470909 ||  || — || February 28, 2009 || Kitt Peak || Spacewatch || AMO +1kmcritical || align=right data-sort-value="0.81" | 810 m || 
|-id=910 bgcolor=#d6d6d6
| 470910 ||  || — || February 27, 2009 || Catalina || CSS || — || align=right | 2.5 km || 
|-id=911 bgcolor=#E9E9E9
| 470911 ||  || — || February 22, 2009 || Kitt Peak || Spacewatch || — || align=right | 2.0 km || 
|-id=912 bgcolor=#d6d6d6
| 470912 ||  || — || February 21, 2009 || Kitt Peak || Spacewatch || TIR || align=right | 2.2 km || 
|-id=913 bgcolor=#d6d6d6
| 470913 ||  || — || January 17, 2009 || Kitt Peak || Spacewatch || — || align=right | 2.4 km || 
|-id=914 bgcolor=#d6d6d6
| 470914 ||  || — || February 13, 2009 || Kitt Peak || Spacewatch || — || align=right | 4.1 km || 
|-id=915 bgcolor=#d6d6d6
| 470915 ||  || — || February 22, 2009 || Kitt Peak || Spacewatch || — || align=right | 2.8 km || 
|-id=916 bgcolor=#d6d6d6
| 470916 ||  || — || January 31, 2009 || Mount Lemmon || Mount Lemmon Survey || — || align=right | 3.1 km || 
|-id=917 bgcolor=#d6d6d6
| 470917 ||  || — || February 22, 2009 || Kitt Peak || Spacewatch || — || align=right | 2.7 km || 
|-id=918 bgcolor=#d6d6d6
| 470918 ||  || — || October 3, 2006 || Kitt Peak || Spacewatch || — || align=right | 2.5 km || 
|-id=919 bgcolor=#d6d6d6
| 470919 ||  || — || February 22, 2009 || Kitt Peak || Spacewatch || EOS || align=right | 1.8 km || 
|-id=920 bgcolor=#d6d6d6
| 470920 ||  || — || February 26, 2009 || Kitt Peak || Spacewatch || EOS || align=right | 1.8 km || 
|-id=921 bgcolor=#d6d6d6
| 470921 ||  || — || February 28, 2009 || Kitt Peak || Spacewatch || — || align=right | 3.9 km || 
|-id=922 bgcolor=#d6d6d6
| 470922 ||  || — || February 3, 2009 || Kitt Peak || Spacewatch || EOS || align=right | 1.6 km || 
|-id=923 bgcolor=#d6d6d6
| 470923 ||  || — || March 1, 2009 || Mount Lemmon || Mount Lemmon Survey || — || align=right | 2.8 km || 
|-id=924 bgcolor=#d6d6d6
| 470924 ||  || — || February 19, 2009 || Kitt Peak || Spacewatch || — || align=right | 2.6 km || 
|-id=925 bgcolor=#d6d6d6
| 470925 ||  || — || March 2, 2009 || Mount Lemmon || Mount Lemmon Survey || — || align=right | 4.0 km || 
|-id=926 bgcolor=#d6d6d6
| 470926 ||  || — || March 3, 2009 || Catalina || CSS || — || align=right | 2.7 km || 
|-id=927 bgcolor=#d6d6d6
| 470927 ||  || — || March 16, 2009 || La Sagra || OAM Obs. || — || align=right | 3.7 km || 
|-id=928 bgcolor=#d6d6d6
| 470928 ||  || — || March 17, 2009 || La Sagra || OAM Obs. || — || align=right | 3.1 km || 
|-id=929 bgcolor=#fefefe
| 470929 ||  || — || February 27, 2009 || Kitt Peak || Spacewatch || — || align=right data-sort-value="0.75" | 750 m || 
|-id=930 bgcolor=#d6d6d6
| 470930 ||  || — || March 17, 2009 || Kitt Peak || Spacewatch || — || align=right | 2.9 km || 
|-id=931 bgcolor=#d6d6d6
| 470931 ||  || — || March 1, 2009 || Kitt Peak || Spacewatch || — || align=right | 2.5 km || 
|-id=932 bgcolor=#d6d6d6
| 470932 ||  || — || March 28, 2009 || Kitt Peak || Spacewatch || — || align=right | 2.7 km || 
|-id=933 bgcolor=#d6d6d6
| 470933 ||  || — || March 31, 2009 || Kitt Peak || Spacewatch || — || align=right | 3.3 km || 
|-id=934 bgcolor=#d6d6d6
| 470934 ||  || — || March 27, 2009 || Kitt Peak || Spacewatch || — || align=right | 3.2 km || 
|-id=935 bgcolor=#d6d6d6
| 470935 ||  || — || August 30, 2005 || Kitt Peak || Spacewatch || — || align=right | 2.4 km || 
|-id=936 bgcolor=#d6d6d6
| 470936 ||  || — || February 9, 2008 || Mount Lemmon || Mount Lemmon Survey || — || align=right | 2.9 km || 
|-id=937 bgcolor=#d6d6d6
| 470937 ||  || — || March 24, 2009 || Mount Lemmon || Mount Lemmon Survey || — || align=right | 2.4 km || 
|-id=938 bgcolor=#fefefe
| 470938 ||  || — || April 22, 2009 || Mount Lemmon || Mount Lemmon Survey || critical || align=right data-sort-value="0.52" | 520 m || 
|-id=939 bgcolor=#d6d6d6
| 470939 ||  || — || April 22, 2009 || Mount Lemmon || Mount Lemmon Survey || — || align=right | 2.7 km || 
|-id=940 bgcolor=#d6d6d6
| 470940 ||  || — || April 22, 2009 || Mount Lemmon || Mount Lemmon Survey || — || align=right | 3.0 km || 
|-id=941 bgcolor=#fefefe
| 470941 ||  || — || April 26, 2009 || Kitt Peak || Spacewatch || — || align=right data-sort-value="0.62" | 620 m || 
|-id=942 bgcolor=#fefefe
| 470942 ||  || — || April 27, 2009 || Kitt Peak || Spacewatch || — || align=right data-sort-value="0.70" | 700 m || 
|-id=943 bgcolor=#d6d6d6
| 470943 ||  || — || April 30, 2009 || Kitt Peak || Spacewatch || — || align=right | 5.1 km || 
|-id=944 bgcolor=#d6d6d6
| 470944 ||  || — || April 17, 2009 || Kitt Peak || Spacewatch ||  || align=right | 3.8 km || 
|-id=945 bgcolor=#fefefe
| 470945 ||  || — || April 26, 2009 || Siding Spring || SSS || — || align=right data-sort-value="0.63" | 630 m || 
|-id=946 bgcolor=#fefefe
| 470946 ||  || — || April 21, 2009 || Socorro || LINEAR || — || align=right data-sort-value="0.69" | 690 m || 
|-id=947 bgcolor=#fefefe
| 470947 ||  || — || April 26, 2009 || Kitt Peak || Spacewatch || — || align=right data-sort-value="0.71" | 710 m || 
|-id=948 bgcolor=#d6d6d6
| 470948 ||  || — || April 18, 2009 || Mount Lemmon || Mount Lemmon Survey || — || align=right | 3.0 km || 
|-id=949 bgcolor=#d6d6d6
| 470949 ||  || — || May 26, 2009 || Kitt Peak || Spacewatch || — || align=right | 2.6 km || 
|-id=950 bgcolor=#fefefe
| 470950 ||  || — || April 27, 2009 || Catalina || CSS || — || align=right data-sort-value="0.82" | 820 m || 
|-id=951 bgcolor=#FFC2E0
| 470951 ||  || — || June 12, 2009 || Catalina || CSS || APO +1km || align=right data-sort-value="0.89" | 890 m || 
|-id=952 bgcolor=#fefefe
| 470952 ||  || — || July 1, 2009 || Siding Spring || SSS || — || align=right data-sort-value="0.90" | 900 m || 
|-id=953 bgcolor=#d6d6d6
| 470953 ||  || — || July 27, 2009 || Catalina || CSS || 3:2 || align=right | 5.3 km || 
|-id=954 bgcolor=#fefefe
| 470954 ||  || — || July 27, 2009 || Kitt Peak || Spacewatch || — || align=right data-sort-value="0.74" | 740 m || 
|-id=955 bgcolor=#fefefe
| 470955 ||  || — || August 1, 2009 || Kitt Peak || Spacewatch || — || align=right data-sort-value="0.68" | 680 m || 
|-id=956 bgcolor=#fefefe
| 470956 ||  || — || August 15, 2009 || Kitt Peak || Spacewatch || — || align=right data-sort-value="0.67" | 670 m || 
|-id=957 bgcolor=#fefefe
| 470957 ||  || — || August 15, 2009 || Kitt Peak || Spacewatch || — || align=right data-sort-value="0.62" | 620 m || 
|-id=958 bgcolor=#FA8072
| 470958 ||  || — || August 16, 2009 || Tzec Maun || F. Tozzi || — || align=right data-sort-value="0.82" | 820 m || 
|-id=959 bgcolor=#fefefe
| 470959 ||  || — || August 16, 2009 || Kitt Peak || Spacewatch || — || align=right data-sort-value="0.57" | 570 m || 
|-id=960 bgcolor=#fefefe
| 470960 ||  || — || August 16, 2009 || Kitt Peak || Spacewatch || — || align=right data-sort-value="0.79" | 790 m || 
|-id=961 bgcolor=#fefefe
| 470961 ||  || — || August 16, 2009 || Kitt Peak || Spacewatch || — || align=right data-sort-value="0.79" | 790 m || 
|-id=962 bgcolor=#fefefe
| 470962 ||  || — || August 17, 2009 || La Sagra || OAM Obs. || — || align=right data-sort-value="0.60" | 600 m || 
|-id=963 bgcolor=#fefefe
| 470963 ||  || — || June 19, 2009 || Kitt Peak || Spacewatch || — || align=right data-sort-value="0.71" | 710 m || 
|-id=964 bgcolor=#fefefe
| 470964 ||  || — || August 27, 2009 || Plana || F. Fratev || — || align=right data-sort-value="0.66" | 660 m || 
|-id=965 bgcolor=#fefefe
| 470965 ||  || — || August 15, 2009 || Kitt Peak || Spacewatch || NYS || align=right data-sort-value="0.59" | 590 m || 
|-id=966 bgcolor=#d6d6d6
| 470966 ||  || — || August 28, 2009 || Kitt Peak || Spacewatch || KOR || align=right | 1.4 km || 
|-id=967 bgcolor=#fefefe
| 470967 ||  || — || September 12, 2009 || Kitt Peak || Spacewatch || — || align=right data-sort-value="0.60" | 600 m || 
|-id=968 bgcolor=#fefefe
| 470968 ||  || — || September 14, 2009 || Kitt Peak || Spacewatch || — || align=right data-sort-value="0.71" | 710 m || 
|-id=969 bgcolor=#fefefe
| 470969 ||  || — || September 14, 2009 || Kitt Peak || Spacewatch || NYS || align=right data-sort-value="0.61" | 610 m || 
|-id=970 bgcolor=#fefefe
| 470970 ||  || — || September 14, 2009 || Kitt Peak || Spacewatch || — || align=right data-sort-value="0.82" | 820 m || 
|-id=971 bgcolor=#fefefe
| 470971 ||  || — || September 15, 2009 || Kitt Peak || Spacewatch || — || align=right data-sort-value="0.85" | 850 m || 
|-id=972 bgcolor=#fefefe
| 470972 ||  || — || September 15, 2009 || Kitt Peak || Spacewatch || MAS || align=right data-sort-value="0.62" | 620 m || 
|-id=973 bgcolor=#fefefe
| 470973 ||  || — || September 15, 2009 || Kitt Peak || Spacewatch || — || align=right data-sort-value="0.72" | 720 m || 
|-id=974 bgcolor=#fefefe
| 470974 ||  || — || September 15, 2009 || Kitt Peak || Spacewatch || — || align=right data-sort-value="0.62" | 620 m || 
|-id=975 bgcolor=#FFC2E0
| 470975 ||  || — || September 19, 2009 || Mount Lemmon || Mount Lemmon Survey || AMO || align=right data-sort-value="0.19" | 190 m || 
|-id=976 bgcolor=#FA8072
| 470976 ||  || — || September 17, 2009 || La Sagra || OAM Obs. || — || align=right data-sort-value="0.67" | 670 m || 
|-id=977 bgcolor=#fefefe
| 470977 ||  || — || September 16, 2009 || Kitt Peak || Spacewatch || H || align=right data-sort-value="0.51" | 510 m || 
|-id=978 bgcolor=#fefefe
| 470978 ||  || — || September 16, 2009 || Kitt Peak || Spacewatch || — || align=right data-sort-value="0.78" | 780 m || 
|-id=979 bgcolor=#fefefe
| 470979 ||  || — || September 17, 2009 || Kitt Peak || Spacewatch || — || align=right data-sort-value="0.68" | 680 m || 
|-id=980 bgcolor=#fefefe
| 470980 ||  || — || September 17, 2009 || Kitt Peak || Spacewatch || V || align=right data-sort-value="0.60" | 600 m || 
|-id=981 bgcolor=#fefefe
| 470981 ||  || — || September 17, 2009 || Kitt Peak || Spacewatch || — || align=right | 1.5 km || 
|-id=982 bgcolor=#E9E9E9
| 470982 ||  || — || September 17, 2009 || Kitt Peak || Spacewatch || — || align=right data-sort-value="0.87" | 870 m || 
|-id=983 bgcolor=#fefefe
| 470983 ||  || — || September 17, 2009 || Kitt Peak || Spacewatch || V || align=right data-sort-value="0.78" | 780 m || 
|-id=984 bgcolor=#fefefe
| 470984 ||  || — || September 17, 2009 || Kitt Peak || Spacewatch || — || align=right data-sort-value="0.86" | 860 m || 
|-id=985 bgcolor=#fefefe
| 470985 ||  || — || September 17, 2009 || Kitt Peak || Spacewatch || V || align=right data-sort-value="0.64" | 640 m || 
|-id=986 bgcolor=#fefefe
| 470986 ||  || — || September 17, 2009 || Mount Lemmon || Mount Lemmon Survey || — || align=right data-sort-value="0.53" | 530 m || 
|-id=987 bgcolor=#fefefe
| 470987 ||  || — || September 18, 2009 || Kitt Peak || Spacewatch || — || align=right data-sort-value="0.58" | 580 m || 
|-id=988 bgcolor=#fefefe
| 470988 ||  || — || September 22, 2009 || Dauban || F. Kugel || NYS || align=right data-sort-value="0.58" | 580 m || 
|-id=989 bgcolor=#fefefe
| 470989 ||  || — || September 25, 2009 || Tzec Maun || Tzec Maun Obs. || — || align=right data-sort-value="0.86" | 860 m || 
|-id=990 bgcolor=#FA8072
| 470990 ||  || — || August 18, 2009 || Catalina || CSS || — || align=right | 1.0 km || 
|-id=991 bgcolor=#fefefe
| 470991 ||  || — || September 18, 2009 || Kitt Peak || Spacewatch || — || align=right data-sort-value="0.68" | 680 m || 
|-id=992 bgcolor=#d6d6d6
| 470992 ||  || — || September 18, 2009 || Kitt Peak || Spacewatch || 3:2 || align=right | 5.1 km || 
|-id=993 bgcolor=#fefefe
| 470993 ||  || — || June 28, 1998 || Kitt Peak || Spacewatch || — || align=right data-sort-value="0.85" | 850 m || 
|-id=994 bgcolor=#fefefe
| 470994 ||  || — || September 18, 2009 || Kitt Peak || Spacewatch || V || align=right data-sort-value="0.45" | 450 m || 
|-id=995 bgcolor=#fefefe
| 470995 ||  || — || September 18, 2009 || Kitt Peak || Spacewatch || — || align=right | 1.7 km || 
|-id=996 bgcolor=#fefefe
| 470996 ||  || — || September 18, 2009 || Kitt Peak || Spacewatch || — || align=right data-sort-value="0.96" | 960 m || 
|-id=997 bgcolor=#fefefe
| 470997 ||  || — || September 19, 2009 || Kitt Peak || Spacewatch || — || align=right data-sort-value="0.69" | 690 m || 
|-id=998 bgcolor=#fefefe
| 470998 ||  || — || September 19, 2009 || Kitt Peak || Spacewatch || MAS || align=right data-sort-value="0.75" | 750 m || 
|-id=999 bgcolor=#fefefe
| 470999 ||  || — || April 9, 2004 || Siding Spring || SSS || — || align=right | 1.1 km || 
|-id=000 bgcolor=#fefefe
| 471000 ||  || — || September 21, 2009 || Kitt Peak || Spacewatch || — || align=right data-sort-value="0.74" | 740 m || 
|}

References

External links 
 Discovery Circumstances: Numbered Minor Planets (470001)–(475000) (IAU Minor Planet Center)

0470